Aizoaceae Martynov, nom. cons. (fig-marigold family) is a large family of dicotyledonous flowering plants in the order Caryophyllales containing 135 currently accepted genera and about 1800 species. They are commonly known as ice plants, carpet weeds or vygies.

23,420 species of vascular plant have been recorded in South Africa, making it the sixth most species-rich country in the world and the most species-rich country on the African continent. Of these, 153 species are considered to be threatened. Nine biomes have been described in South Africa: Fynbos, Succulent Karoo, desert, Nama Karoo, grassland, savanna, Albany thickets, the Indian Ocean coastal belt, and forests.

The 2018 South African National Biodiversity Institute's National Biodiversity Assessment plant checklist lists 35,130 taxa in the phyla Anthocerotophyta (hornworts (6)), Anthophyta (flowering plants (33534)), Bryophyta (mosses (685)), Cycadophyta (cycads (42)), Lycopodiophyta (Lycophytes(45)), Marchantiophyta (liverworts (376)), Pinophyta (conifers (33)), and Pteridophyta (cryptogams (408)).

169 genera are represented in the literature. Listed taxa include species, subspecies, varieties, and forms as recorded, some of which have subsequently been allocated to other taxa as synonyms, in which cases the accepted taxon is appended to the listing. Multiple entries under alternative names reflect taxonomic revision over time.

Acrodon 
Genus Acrodon:
 Acrodon bellidiflorus (L.) N.E.Br. endemic
 Acrodon caespitosus H.E.K.Hartmann, endemic
 Acrodon deminutus Klak, endemic
 Acrodon duplessiae (L.Bolus) Glen, accepted as Acrodon bellidiflorus (L.) N.E.Br. present
 Acrodon leptophyll (L.Bolus) Glen, accepted as Acrodon subulatus (Mill.) N.E.Br. present
 Acrodon parvifolius R.du Plessis, endemic
 Acrodon purpureostylus (L.Bolus) Burgoyne, endemic
 Acrodon quarcicola H.E.K.Hartmann, endemic
 Acrodon subulatus (Mill.) N.E.Br. endemic

Acrosanthes 
Genus Acrosanthes:
 Acrosanthes anceps (Thunb.) Sond. endemic
 Acrosanthes angustifolia Eckl. & Zeyh. endemic
 Acrosanthes decandra Fenzl, accepted as Acrosanthes humifusa (Thunb.) Sond. indigenous
 Acrosanthes fistulosa Eckl. & Zeyh. accepted as Acrosanthes anceps (Thunb.) Sond. indigenous
 Acrosanthes humifusa (Thunb.) Sond. endemic
 Acrosanthes microphylla Adamson, endemic
 Acrosanthes parviflora J.C.Manning & Goldblatt, endemic
 Acrosanthes teretifolia Eckl. & Zeyh. endemic

Aethephyllum 
Genus Aethephyllum:
 Aethephyllum pinnatifidum (L.f.) N.E.Br. endemic

Aizoanthemum 
Genus Aizoanthemum:
 Aizoanthemum membrumconnectens Dinter ex Friedrich, accepted as Aizoanthemum rehmannii (Schinz) H.E.K.Hartmann

Aizoon 
Genus Aizoon:
 Aizoon asbestinum Schltr. indigenous
 Aizoon burchellii N.E.Br. indigenous
 Aizoon canariense L. indigenous
 Aizoon glinoides L.f. endemic
 Aizoon karooicum Compton, endemic
 Aizoon paniculatum L. endemic
 Aizoon rigidum L.f. endemic
 Aizoon rigidum L.f. var. angustifolium Sond. accepted as Aizoon rigidum L.f. present
 Aizoon rigidum L.f. var. villosum Adamson, accepted as Aizoon rigidum L.f. present
 Aizoon sarmentosum L.f. endemic
 Aizoon schellenbergii Adamson, indigenous
 Aizoon zeyheri Sond. endemic

Aloinopsis 
Genus Aloinopsis:
 Aloinopsis acuta L.Bolus, endemic
 Aloinopsis hilmarii (L.Bolus) L.Bolus, accepted as Deilanthe hilmarii (L.Bolus) H.E.K.Hartmann, present
 Aloinopsis jamesii L.Bolus, accepted as Aloinopsis rubrolineata (N.E.Br.) Schwantes, present
 Aloinopsis lodewykii L.Bolus, accepted as Aloinopsis luckhoffii (L.Bolus) L.Bolus, present
 Aloinopsis loganii (L.Bolus) L.Bolus, endemic
 Aloinopsis luckhoffii (L.Bolus) L.Bolus, endemic
 Aloinopsis malherbei (L.Bolus) L.Bolus, endemic
 Aloinopsis orpenii (N.E.Br.) L.Bolus, accepted as Prepodesma orpenii (N.E.Br.) N.E.Br. present
 Aloinopsis peersii (L.Bolus) L.Bolus, accepted as Deilanthe peersii (L.Bolus) N.E.Br. present
 Aloinopsis rosulata (Kensit) Schwantes, endemic
 Aloinopsis rubrolineata (N.E.Br.) Schwantes, endemic
 Aloinopsis schooneesii L.Bolus, endemic
 Aloinopsis schooneesii L.Bolus var. acutipetala L.Bolus, accepted as Aloinopsis schooneesii L.Bolus, present
 Aloinopsis schooneesii L.Bolus var. willowmorensis L.Bolus, accepted as Aloinopsis schooneesii L.Bolus, present
 Aloinopsis setifera (L.Bolus) L.Bolus, accepted as Aloinopsis luckhoffii (L.Bolus) L.Bolus, present
 Aloinopsis spathulata (Thunb.) L.Bolus, endemic
 Aloinopsis thudichumii L.Bolus, accepted as Deilanthe thudichumii (L.Bolus) S.A.Hammer, present
 Aloinopsis villetii (L.Bolus) L.Bolus, accepted as Aloinopsis luckhoffii (L.Bolus) L.Bolus, present

Amoebophyllum 
Genus Amoebophyllum:
 Amoebophyllum angustum N.E.Br. accepted as Mesembryanthemum vanheerdei (L.Bolus) Klak, indigenous
 Amoebophyllum guerichianum (Pax) N.E.Br. accepted as Mesembryanthemum guerichianum Pax, indigenous
 Amoebophyllum rangei N.E.Br. accepted as Mesembryanthemum oculatum N.E.Br. indigenous
 Amoebophyllum roseum L.Bolus, accepted as Mesembryanthemum vanheerdei (L.Bolus) Klak, indigenous

Amphibolia 
Genus Amphibolia:
 Amphibolia gydouwensis (L.Bolus) L.Bolus ex Toelken & Jessop, accepted as Phiambolia incumbens (L.Bolus) Klak, present
 Amphibolia hallii (L.Bolus) L.Bolus, accepted as Phiambolia hallii (L.Bolus) Klak, present
 Amphibolia hutchinsonii (L.Bolus) H.E.K.Hartmann, accepted as Amphibolia laevis (Aiton) H.E.K.Hartmann, present
 Amphibolia laevis (Aiton) H.E.K.Hartmann, endemic
 Amphibolia littlewoodii (L.Bolus) L.Bolus ex Toelken & Jessop, accepted as Ruschia mutata G.D.Rowley, present
 Amphibolia maritima L.Bolus ex Toelken & Jessop, accepted as Amphibolia laevis (Aiton) H.E.K.Hartmann, present
 Amphibolia obscura H.E.K.Hartmann, indigenous
 Amphibolia rupis-arcuatae (Dinter) H.E.K.Hartmann, indigenous
 Amphibolia stayneri L.Bolus ex Toelken & Jessop, accepted as Phiambolia littlewoodii (L.Bolus) Klak, present
 Amphibolia succulenta (L.Bolus) H.E.K.Hartmann, indigenous

Antegibbaeum 
Genus Antegibbaeum:
 Antegibbaeum fissoides (Haw.) Schwantes ex C.Weber, endemic

Antimima 
Genus Antimima:
 Antimima addita (L.Bolus) H.E.K.Hartmann, endemic
 Antimima alborubra (L.Bolus) Dehn, endemic
 Antimima amoena (Schwantes) H.E.K.Hartmann, endemic
 Antimima androsacea (Marloth & Schwantes) H.E.K.Hartmann, endemic
 Antimima aristulata (Sond.) Chess. & Gideon F.Sm. endemic
 Antimima biformis (N.E.Br.) H.E.K.Hartmann, endemic
 Antimima bina (L.Bolus) H.E.K.Hartmann, accepted as Antimima viatorum (L.Bolus) Klak, present
 Antimima bracteata (L.Bolus) H.E.K.Hartmann, endemic
 Antimima brevicarpa (L.Bolus) H.E.K.Hartmann, endemic
 Antimima brevicollis (N.E.Br.) H.E.K.Hartmann, endemic
 Antimima compacta (L.Bolus) H.E.K.Hartmann, endemic
 Antimima compressa (L.Bolus) H.E.K.Hartmann, endemic
 Antimima concinna (L.Bolus) H.E.K.Hartmann, accepted as Antimima aristulata (Sond.) Chess. & Gideon F.Sm. endemic
 Antimima condensa (N.E.Br.) H.E.K.Hartmann, endemic
 Antimima crassifolia (L.Bolus) H.E.K.Hartmann, accepted as Antimima paripetala (L.Bolus) Klak, endemic
 Antimima dasyphylla (Schltr.) H.E.K.Hartmann, endemic
 Antimima defecta (L.Bolus) H.E.K.Hartmann, endemic
 Antimima dekenahi (N.E.Br.) H.E.K.Hartmann, endemic
 Antimima distans (L.Bolus) H.E.K.Hartmann, endemic
 Antimima dualis (N.E.Br.) N.E.Br. endemic
 Antimima elevata (L.Bolus) H.E.K.Hartmann, endemic
 Antimima emarcescens (L.Bolus) H.E.K.Hartmann, endemic
 Antimima erosa (L.Bolus) H.E.K.Hartmann, endemic
 Antimima evoluta (N.E.Br.) H.E.K.Hartmann, endemic
 Antimima excedens (L.Bolus) Klak, endemic
 Antimima exsurgens (L.Bolus) H.E.K.Hartmann, endemic
 Antimima fenestrata (L.Bolus) H.E.K.Hartmann, endemic
 Antimima fergusoniae (L.Bolus) H.E.K.Hartmann, endemic
 Antimima gracillima (L.Bolus) H.E.K.Hartmann, endemic
 Antimima granitica (L.Bolus) H.E.K.Hartmann, endemic
 Antimima hallii (L.Bolus) H.E.K.Hartmann, endemic
 Antimima hamatilis (L.Bolus) H.E.K.Hartmann, endemic
 Antimima hantamensis (Engl.) H.E.K.Hartmann & Stuber, endemic
 Antimima herrei (Schwantes) H.E.K.Hartmann, endemic
 Antimima hexamera (L.Bolus) Klak, accepted as Antimima paripetala (L.Bolus) Klak, present
 Antimima insidens (L.Bolus) Chess. endemic
 Antimima intervallaris (L.Bolus) H.E.K.Hartmann, endemic
 Antimima ivori (N.E.Br.) H.E.K.Hartmann, endemic
 Antimima karroidea (L.Bolus) H.E.K.Hartmann, endemic
 Antimima klaverensis (L.Bolus) H.E.K.Hartmann, endemic
 Antimima koekenaapensis (L.Bolus) H.E.K.Hartmann, endemic
 Antimima komkansica (L.Bolus) H.E.K.Hartmann, endemic
 Antimima lawsonii (L.Bolus) H.E.K.Hartmann, endemic
 Antimima leipoldtii (L.Bolus) H.E.K.Hartmann, endemic
 Antimima leucanthera (L.Bolus) H.E.K.Hartmann, endemic
 Antimima limbata (N.E.Br.) H.E.K.Hartmann, accepted as Antimima granitica (L.Bolus) H.E.K.Hartmann, endemic
 Antimima lodewykii (L.Bolus) H.E.K.Hartmann, endemic
 Antimima loganii (L.Bolus) H.E.K.Hartmann, endemic
 Antimima lokenbergensis (L.Bolus) H.E.K.Hartmann, endemic
 Antimima longipes (L.Bolus) Dehn, endemic
 Antimima luckhoffii (L.Bolus) H.E.K.Hartmann, endemic
 Antimima maleolens (L.Bolus) H.E.K.Hartmann, endemic
 Antimima maxwellii (L.Bolus) H.E.K.Hartmann, endemic
 Antimima menniei (L.Bolus) H.E.K.Hartmann, accepted as Antimima aristulata (Sond.) Chess. & Gideon F.Sm. endemic
 Antimima mesklipensis (L.Bolus) H.E.K.Hartmann, endemic
 Antimima meyerae (Schwantes) H.E.K.Hartmann, endemic
 Antimima microphylla (Haw.) Dehn, endemic
 Antimima minima (Tischer) H.E.K.Hartmann, endemic
 Antimima minutifolia (L.Bolus) H.E.K.Hartmann, endemic
 Antimima mucronata (Haw.) H.E.K.Hartmann, endemic
 Antimima mutica (L.Bolus) H.E.K.Hartmann, endemic
 Antimima nobilis (Schwantes) H.E.K.Hartmann, endemic
 Antimima nordenstamii (L.Bolus) H.E.K.Hartmann, endemic
 Antimima oviformis (L.Bolus) H.E.K.Hartmann, endemic
 Antimima papillata (L.Bolus) H.E.K.Hartmann, endemic
 Antimima paripetala (L.Bolus) Klak, indigenous
 Antimima paucifolia (L.Bolus) H.E.K.Hartmann, endemic
 Antimima pauper (L.Bolus) H.E.K.Hartmann, endemic
 Antimima peersii (L.Bolus) H.E.K.Hartmann, endemic
 Antimima persistens (L.Bolus) H.E.K.Hartmann, endemic
 Antimima pilosula (L.Bolus) H.E.K.Hartmann, endemic
 Antimima piscodora (L.Bolus) H.E.K.Hartmann, endemic
 Antimima prolongata (L.Bolus) H.E.K.Hartmann, endemic
 Antimima propinqua (N.E.Br.) H.E.K.Hartmann, endemic
 Antimima prostrata (L.Bolus) H.E.K.Hartmann, endemic
 Antimima pumila (Fedde & C.Schust.) H.E.K.Hartmann, endemic
 Antimima pusilla (Schwantes) H.E.K.Hartmann, endemic
 Antimima pygmaea (Haw.) H.E.K.Hartmann, endemic
 Antimima radicans (L.Bolus) Klak, endemic
 Antimima roseola (N.E.Br.) H.E.K.Hartmann, endemic
 Antimima saturata (L.Bolus) H.E.K.Hartmann, endemic
 Antimima saxicola (L.Bolus) H.E.K.Hartmann, endemic
 Antimima schlechteri (Schwantes) H.E.K.Hartmann, endemic
 Antimima simulans (L.Bolus) H.E.K.Hartmann, endemic
 Antimima sobrina (N.E.Br.) H.E.K.Hartmann, endemic
 Antimima solida (L.Bolus) H.E.K.Hartmann, endemic
 Antimima stayneri (L.Bolus) H.E.K.Hartmann, endemic
 Antimima stokoei (L.Bolus) H.E.K.Hartmann, endemic
 Antimima subtruncata (L.Bolus) H.E.K.Hartmann, endemic
 Antimima triquetra (L.Bolus) H.E.K.Hartmann, endemic
 Antimima tuberculosa (L.Bolus) H.E.K.Hartmann, endemic
 Antimima turneriana (L.Bolus) H.E.K.Hartmann, endemic
 Antimima vanzylii (L.Bolus) H.E.K.Hartmann, endemic
 Antimima varians (L.Bolus) H.E.K.Hartmann, endemic
 Antimima ventricosa (L.Bolus) H.E.K.Hartmann, endemic
 Antimima verruculosa (L.Bolus) H.E.K.Hartmann, endemic
 Antimima viatorum (L.Bolus) Klak, endemic
 Antimima virgata (Haw.) Dehn, accepted as Ruschia virgata (Haw.) L.Bolus, present
 Antimima watermeyeri (L.Bolus) H.E.K.Hartmann, endemic
 Antimima wittebergensis (L.Bolus) H.E.K.Hartmann, endemic

Anysocalyx 
Genus Anysocalyx:
 Anysocalyx vaginatus (L.Bolus) L.Bolus, accepted as Jacobsenia vaginata (L.Bolus) Ihlenf. present

Apatesia 
Genus Apatesia:
 Apatesia helianthoides (Aiton) N.E.Br. endemic
 Apatesia pillansii N.E.Br. endemic
 Apatesia sabulosa (Thunb.) L.Bolus, endemic

Aptenia 
Genus Aptenia:
 Aptenia cordifolia (L.f.) Schwantes, accepted as Mesembryanthemum cordifolium L.f. endemic
 Aptenia geniculiflora (L.) Bittrich ex Gerbaulet, accepted as Mesembryanthemum geniculiflorum L. endemic
 Aptenia haeckeliana (A.Berger) Bittrich ex Gerbaulet, accepted as Mesembryanthemum haeckelianum A.Berger, endemic
 Aptenia lancifolia L.Bolus, accepted as Mesembryanthemum lancifolium (L.Bolus) Klak, endemic

Arenifera 
Genus Arenifera:
 Arenifera pillansii (L.Bolus) Herre, endemic
 Arenifera pungens H.E.K.Hartmann, endemic
 Arenifera spinescens (L.Bolus) H.E.K.Hartmann, endemic
 Arenifera stylosa (L.Bolus) H.E.K.Hartmann, endemic

Argeta 
Genus Argeta:
 Argeta petrense N.E.Br. accepted as Gibbaeum petrense (N.E.Br.) Tischer, indigenous

Argyroderma 
Genus Argyroderma:
 Argyroderma congregatum L.Bolus, endemic
 Argyroderma crateriforme (L.Bolus) N.E.Br. endemic
 Argyroderma delaetii C.A.Maass, endemic
 Argyroderma fissum (Haw.) L.Bolus, endemic
 Argyroderma framesii L.Bolus, indigenous
 Argyroderma framesii L.Bolus subsp. framesii, endemic
 Argyroderma framesii L.Bolus subsp. hallii (L.Bolus) H.E.K.Hartmann, endemic
 Argyroderma patens L.Bolus, endemic
 Argyroderma pearsonii (N.E.Br.) Schwantes, endemic
 Argyroderma ringens L.Bolus, endemic
 Argyroderma subalbum (N.E.Br.) N.E.Br. endemic
 Argyroderma testiculare (Aiton) N.E.Br. endemic
 Argyroderma theartii Van Jaarsv. endemic

Aridaria 
Genus Aridaria:
 Aridaria abbreviata L.Bolus, accepted as Mesembryanthemum lilliputanum Klak, indigenous
 Aridaria albertensis L.Bolus, accepted as Mesembryanthemum oubergense (L.Bolus) Klak, indigenous
 Aridaria anguinea L.Bolus, accepted as Mesembryanthemum oculatum N.E.Br. indigenous
 Aridaria arenicola L.Bolus, accepted as Mesembryanthemum oculatum N.E.Br. indigenous
 Aridaria aurea (Thunb.) L.Bolus, accepted as Mesembryanthemum nitidum Haw. indigenous
 Aridaria ausana (Dinter & A.Berger) Dinter & Schwantes, accepted as Mesembryanthemum tetragonum Thunb. present
 Aridaria barkerae L.Bolus, accepted as Mesembryanthemum noctiflorum L. subsp. defoliatum (Haw.) Klak, present
 Aridaria beaufortensis L.Bolus, accepted as Mesembryanthemum noctiflorum L. subsp. stramineum (Haw.) Klak, present
 Aridaria brevicarpa L.Bolus, accepted as Mesembryanthemum brevicarpum (L.Bolus) Klak, indigenous
 Aridaria brevifolia L.Bolus, accepted as Mesembryanthemum splendens L. subsp. splendens, present
 Aridaria brevisepala L.Bolus, accepted as Mesembryanthemum spinuliferum Haw. indigenous
 Aridaria canaliculata (Haw.) Friedrich, accepted as Mesembryanthemum canaliculatum Haw. indigenous
 Aridaria caudata (L.Bolus) L.Bolus, accepted as Mesembryanthemum caudatum L.Bolus, indigenous
 Aridaria congesta L.Bolus, accepted as Mesembryanthemum flavidum Klak, present
 Aridaria decidua L.Bolus, accepted as Mesembryanthemum deciduum (L.Bolus) Klak, indigenous
 Aridaria decurvata L.Bolus, accepted as Mesembryanthemum decurvatum (L.Bolus) Klak, indigenous
 Aridaria defoliata (Haw.) Schwantes, accepted as Mesembryanthemum noctiflorum L. subsp. defoliatum (Haw.) Klak, indigenous
 Aridaria dejagerae L.Bolus, accepted as Mesembryanthemum noctiflorum L. subsp. stramineum (Haw.) Klak
 Aridaria dinteri L.Bolus, accepted as Mesembryanthemum ligneum (L.Bolus) Klak, indigenous
 Aridaria elongata L.Bolus, accepted as Mesembryanthemum prasinum (L.Bolus) Klak, indigenous
 Aridaria englishiae (L.Bolus) N.E.Br. accepted as Mesembryanthemum englishiae L.Bolus, indigenous
 Aridaria fragilis (N.E.Br.) Friedrich, accepted as Mesembryanthemum oculatum N.E.Br. indigenous
 Aridaria framesii L.Bolus, accepted as Mesembryanthemum spinuliferum Haw. indigenous
 Aridaria geniculiflora (L.) N.E.Br. accepted as Mesembryanthemum geniculiflorum L. indigenous
 Aridaria gibbosa L.Bolus, accepted as Mesembryanthemum spinuliferum Haw. indigenous
 Aridaria glandulifera L.Bolus, accepted as Mesembryanthemum sinuosum L.Bolus, indigenous
 Aridaria godmaniae L.Bolus, accepted as Mesembryanthemum sinuosum L.Bolus, indigenous
 Aridaria gratiae L.Bolus, accepted as Mesembryanthemum grossum Aiton, indigenous
 Aridaria grossa (Aiton) Friedrich, accepted as Mesembryanthemum grossum Aiton, indigenous
 Aridaria herbertii (N.E.Br.) Friedrich, accepted as Mesembryanthemum lilliputanum Klak, indigenous
 Aridaria hesperantha (L.Bolus) N.E.Br. accepted as Mesembryanthemum longistylum DC. indigenous
 Aridaria inaequalis L.Bolus, accepted as Mesembryanthemum nitidum Haw. indigenous
 Aridaria klaverensis L.Bolus, accepted as Mesembryanthemum brevicarpum (L.Bolus) Klak, present
 Aridaria latipetala L.Bolus, accepted as Mesembryanthemum latipetalum (L.Bolus) Klak, indigenous
 Aridaria laxa L.Bolus, accepted as Mesembryanthemum decurvatum (L.Bolus) Klak, indigenous
 Aridaria laxipetala L.Bolus, accepted as Mesembryanthemum grossum Aiton, indigenous
 Aridaria leipoldtii L.Bolus, accepted as Mesembryanthemum noctiflorum L. subsp. noctiflorum, present
 Aridaria lignea L.Bolus, accepted as Mesembryanthemum ligneum (L.Bolus) Klak, indigenous
 Aridaria longispinula (Haw.) L.Bolus, accepted as Mesembryanthemum grossum Aiton, indigenous
 Aridaria longistyla (DC.) Schwantes, accepted as Mesembryanthemum longistylum DC. indigenous
 Aridaria longituba L.Bolus, accepted as Mesembryanthemum tenuiflorum Jacq. indigenous
 Aridaria luteoalba L.Bolus, accepted as Mesembryanthemum tetragonum Thunb. indigenous
 Aridaria macrosiphon L.Bolus, accepted as Mesembryanthemum tenuiflorum Jacq. indigenous
 Aridaria muirii N.E.Br. accepted as Mesembryanthemum noctiflorum L. subsp. defoliatum (Haw.) Klak, present
 Aridaria multiseriata L.Bolus, accepted as Mesembryanthemum prasinum (L.Bolus) Klak, indigenous
 Aridaria mutans L.Bolus, accepted as Mesembryanthemum tetragonum Thunb. present
 Aridaria nevillei L.Bolus, accepted as Mesembryanthemum noctiflorum L. subsp. noctiflorum
 Aridaria nitida (Haw.) N.E.Br. accepted as Mesembryanthemum nitidum Haw. indigenous
 Aridaria noctiflora (L.) Schwantes, accepted as Mesembryanthemum noctiflorum L. subsp. noctiflorum, indigenous
 Aridaria noctiflora (L.) Schwantes subsp. defoliata (Haw.) Gerbaulet, accepted as Mesembryanthemum noctiflorum L. subsp. defoliatum (Haw.) Klak, endemic
 Aridaria noctiflora (L.) Schwantes subsp. straminea (Haw.) Gerbaulet, accepted as Mesembryanthemum noctiflorum L. subsp. stramineum (Haw.) Klak, indigenous
 Aridaria noctiflora (L.) Schwantes var. fulva (Haw.) A.G.J.Herre & Friedrich, accepted as Mesembryanthemum noctiflorum L. subsp. stramineum (Haw.) Klak
 Aridaria obtusa L.Bolus, accepted as Mesembryanthemum decurvatum (L.Bolus) Klak, present
 Aridaria oculata (N.E.Br.) L.Bolus, accepted as Mesembryanthemum oculatum N.E.Br. indigenous
 Aridaria oubergensis L.Bolus, accepted as Mesembryanthemum oubergense (L.Bolus) Klak, indigenous
 Aridaria ovalis L.Bolus, accepted as Mesembryanthemum serotinum (L.Bolus) Klak, present
 Aridaria parvisepala L.Bolus, accepted as Mesembryanthemum spinuliferum Haw. indigenous
 Aridaria pentagona L.Bolus, accepted as Mesembryanthemum splendens L. subsp. pentagonum (L.Bolus) Klak, indigenous
 Aridaria pentagona L.Bolus var. occidentalis L.Bolus, accepted as Mesembryanthemum splendens L. subsp. pentagonum (L.Bolus) Klak, present
 Aridaria pillansii L.Bolus, accepted as Mesembryanthemum noctiflorum L. subsp. noctiflorum, present
 Aridaria platysepala L.Bolus, accepted as Mesembryanthemum grossum Aiton, indigenous
 Aridaria pomonae L.Bolus, accepted as Mesembryanthemum oculatum N.E.Br. indigenous
 Aridaria prasina L.Bolus, accepted as Mesembryanthemum prasinum (L.Bolus) Klak, indigenous
 Aridaria pumila L.Bolus, accepted as Mesembryanthemum oubergense (L.Bolus) Klak, indigenous
 Aridaria quartzitica L.Bolus, accepted as Mesembryanthemum quartziticola Klak, indigenous
 Aridaria quaterna L.Bolus, accepted as Mesembryanthemum spinuliferum Haw. indigenous
 Aridaria rabiei L.Bolus, accepted as Mesembryanthemum rabiei (L.Bolus) Klak, endemic
 Aridaria radicans L.Bolus, accepted as Mesembryanthemum rhizophorum Klak, indigenous
 Aridaria rangei (N.E.Br.) Friedrich, accepted as Mesembryanthemum oculatum N.E.Br. indigenous
 Aridaria recurva L.Bolus, accepted as Mesembryanthemum sinuosum L.Bolus, indigenous
 Aridaria resurgens (Kensit) L.Bolus, accepted as Mesembryanthemum resurgens Kensit, indigenous
 Aridaria rhodandra L.Bolus, accepted as Mesembryanthemum nitidum Haw. indigenous
 Aridaria saturata L.Bolus, accepted as Mesembryanthemum baylissii (L.Bolus) Klak, present
 Aridaria scintillans (Dinter) Friedrich, accepted as Mesembryanthemum oculatum N.E.Br. indigenous
 Aridaria serotina L.Bolus, accepted as Mesembryanthemum serotinum (L.Bolus) Klak, indigenous
 Aridaria spinulifera (Haw.) N.E.Br. accepted as Mesembryanthemum spinuliferum Haw. indigenous
 Aridaria splendens (L.) Schwantes, accepted as Mesembryanthemum splendens L. subsp. splendens, present
 Aridaria straminea (Haw.) Schwantes, accepted as Mesembryanthemum noctiflorum L. subsp. stramineum (Haw.) Klak, indigenous
 Aridaria straminea L.Bolus, accepted as Mesembryanthemum sinuosum L.Bolus, indigenous
 Aridaria straminicolor L.Bolus, accepted as Mesembryanthemum sinuosum L.Bolus, indigenous
 Aridaria stricta L.Bolus, accepted as Mesembryanthemum spinuliferum Haw. indigenous
 Aridaria subpetiolata L.Bolus, accepted as Mesembryanthemum grossum Aiton, indigenous
 Aridaria suffusa L.Bolus, accepted as Mesembryanthemum tetragonum Thunb. indigenous
 Aridaria tetragona (Thunb.) L.Bolus, accepted as Mesembryanthemum tetragonum Thunb. indigenous
 Aridaria tetramera L.Bolus, accepted as Mesembryanthemum trichotomum Thunb. indigenous
 Aridaria tetramera L.Bolus var. parviflora L.Bolus, accepted as Mesembryanthemum trichotomum Thunb. indigenous
 Aridaria trichotoma (Thunb.) L.Bolus, accepted as Mesembryanthemum trichotomum Thunb. indigenous
 Aridaria varians L.Bolus, accepted as Mesembryanthemum oculatum N.E.Br. indigenous
 Aridaria vespertina L.Bolus, accepted as Mesembryanthemum occidentale Klak, endemic
 Aridaria viridiflora (Aiton) L.Bolus, accepted as Mesembryanthemum viridiflorum Aiton, indigenous
 Aridaria watermeyeri L.Bolus, accepted as Mesembryanthemum spinuliferum Haw. indigenous
 Aridaria willowmorensis L.Bolus, accepted as Mesembryanthemum grossum Aiton, indigenous

Aspazoma 
Genus Aspazoma:
 Aspazoma amplectens (L.Bolus) N.E.Br. accepted as Mesembryanthemum amplectens L.Bolus, endemic

Astridia 
Genus Astridia:
 Astridia alba (L.Bolus) L.Bolus, indigenous
 Astridia citrina (L.Bolus) L.Bolus, indigenous
 Astridia dulcis L.Bolus, endemic
 Astridia herrei L.Bolus, endemic
 Astridia hillii L.Bolus, endemic
 Astridia longifolia (L.Bolus) L.Bolus, indigenous
 Astridia lutata (L.Bolus) Friedrich ex H.E.K.Hartmann, indigenous
 Astridia rubra (L.Bolus) L.Bolus, endemic
 Astridia speciosa L.Bolus, indigenous
 Astridia vanheerdei L.Bolus, endemic

Bergeranthus 
Genus Bergeranthus:
 Bergeranthus addoensis L.Bolus, endemic
 Bergeranthus albomarginatus A.P.Dold & S.A.Hammer, endemic
 Bergeranthus artus L.Bolus, endemic
 Bergeranthus concavus L.Bolus, endemic
 Bergeranthus firmus L.Bolus, accepted as Bergeranthus multiceps (Salm-Dyck) Schwantes, indigenous
 Bergeranthus glenensis N.E.Br. accepted as Hereroa glenensis (N.E.Br.) L.Bolus, present
 Bergeranthus jamesii L.Bolus, accepted as Bergeranthus vespertinus (A.Berger) Schwantes, indigenous
 Bergeranthus katbergensis L.Bolus, endemic
 Bergeranthus leightoniae L.Bolus, endemic
 Bergeranthus longisepalus L.Bolus, accepted as Bergeranthus vespertinus (A.Berger) Schwantes, indigenous
 Bergeranthus multiceps (Salm-Dyck) Schwantes, endemic
 Bergeranthus nanus A.P.Dold & S.A.Hammer, endemic
 Bergeranthus scapiger (Haw.) Schwantes, endemic
 Bergeranthus stenophyllus (L.Bolus) Schwantes ex Fourc. accepted as Marlothistella stenophylla (L.Bolus) S.A.Hammer, indigenous
 Bergeranthus vespertinus (A.Berger) Schwantes, endemic

Bijlia 
Genus Bijlia:
 Bijlia dilatata H.E.K.Hartmann, endemic
 Bijlia tugwelliae (L.Bolus) S.A.Hammer, endemic

Braunsia 
Genus Braunsia:
 Braunsia apiculata (Kensit) L.Bolus, endemic
 Braunsia bina (N.E.Br.) Schwantes, endemic
 Braunsia geminata (Haw.) L.Bolus, endemic
 Braunsia maximilianii (Schltr. & A.Berger) Schwantes, endemic
 Braunsia nelii Schwantes, indigenous
 Braunsia stayneri (L.Bolus) L.Bolus, endemic
 Braunsia vanrensburgii (L.Bolus) L.Bolus, endemic

Brianhuntleya 
Genus Brianhuntleya:
 Brianhuntleya intrusa (Kensit) Chess. S.A.Hammer & I.Oliv. endemic

Brownanthus 
Genus Brownanthus:
 Brownanthus arenosus (Schinz) Ihlenf. & Bittrich, accepted as Mesembryanthemum arenosum Schinz, indigenous
 Brownanthus ciliatus (Aiton) Schwantes, accepted as Mesembryanthemum vaginatum Lam. indigenous
 Brownanthus ciliatus (Aiton) Schwantes subsp. schenkii (Schinz) Ihlenf. & Bittrich, accepted as Mesembryanthemum schenkii Schinz, indigenous
 Brownanthus corallinus (Thunb.) Ihlenf. & Bittrich, accepted as Mesembryanthemum corallinum Thunb. indigenous
 Brownanthus fraternus Klak, accepted as Mesembryanthemum napierense Klak, endemic
 Brownanthus glareicola Klak, accepted as Mesembryanthemum glareicola (Klak) Klak, endemic
 Brownanthus lignescens Klak, accepted as Mesembryanthemum springbokense Klak, endemic
 Brownanthus marlothii (Pax) Schwantes, accepted as Mesembryanthemum marlothii Pax, indigenous
 Brownanthus neglectus S.M.Pierce & Gerbaulet, accepted as Mesembryanthemum neglectum (S.M.Pierce & Gerbaulet) Klak, indigenous
 Brownanthus nucifer (Ihlenf. & Bittrich) S.M.Pierce & Gerbaulet, accepted as Mesembryanthemum nucifer (Ihlenf. & Bittrich) Klak, indigenous
 Brownanthus pseudoschlichtianus S.M.Pierce & Gerbaulet, accepted as Mesembryanthemum pseudoschlichtianum (S.M.Pierce & Gerbaulet) Klak, indigenous
 Brownanthus pubescens (N.E.Br. ex C.A.Maass) Bullock, accepted as Mesembryanthemum tomentosum Klak, indigenous
 Brownanthus schenckii (Schinz) Schwantes, accepted as Mesembryanthemum schenkii Schinz, indigenous
 Brownanthus schlichtianus (Sond.) Ihlenf. & Bittrich, accepted as Mesembryanthemum arenosum Schinz, present
 Brownanthus vaginatus (Lam.) Chess. & M.Pignal, accepted as Mesembryanthemum vaginatum Lam. endemic

Calamophyllum 
Genus Calamophyllum:
 Calamophyllum cylindricum (Haw.) Schwantes, endemic
 Calamophyllum teretifolium (Haw.) Schwantes, endemic
 Calamophyllum teretiusculum (Haw.) Schwantes, endemic

Callistigma 
Genus Callistigma:
 Callistigma inachabense (Engl.) Dinter & Schwantes, accepted as Mesembryanthemum inachabense Engl. indigenous

Carpanthea 
Genus Carpanthea:
 Carpanthea pomeridiana (L.) N.E.Br. endemic

Carpobrotus 
Genus Carpobrotus:
 Carpobrotus acinaciformis (L.) L.Bolus, endemic
 Carpobrotus concavus L.Bolus, accepted as Carpobrotus acinaciformis (L.) L.Bolus, present
 Carpobrotus deliciosus (L.Bolus) L.Bolus, endemic
 Carpobrotus dimidiatus (Haw.) L.Bolus, indigenous
 Carpobrotus dulcis L.Bolus, accepted as Carpobrotus deliciosus (L.Bolus) L.Bolus, present
 Carpobrotus edulis (L.) L.Bolus, indigenous
 Carpobrotus edulis (L.) L.Bolus subsp. edulis, endemic
 Carpobrotus edulis (L.) L.Bolus subsp. parviflorus Wisura & Glen, endemic
 Carpobrotus fourcadei L.Bolus var. alba L.Bolus, accepted as Carpobrotus deliciosus (L.Bolus) L.Bolus, present
 Carpobrotus fourcadei L.Bolus var. fourcadei, accepted as Carpobrotus deliciosus (L.Bolus) L.Bolus, present
 Carpobrotus juritzii (L.Bolus) L.Bolus, accepted as Carpobrotus dimidiatus (Haw.) L.Bolus, present
 Carpobrotus laevigatus (Haw.) N.E.Br. accepted as Carpobrotus acinaciformis (L.) L.Bolus, present
 Carpobrotus laevigatus (Haw.) Schwantes, accepted as Carpobrotus acinaciformis (L.) L.Bolus, present
 Carpobrotus mellei (L.Bolus) L.Bolus, endemic
 Carpobrotus muirii (L.Bolus) L.Bolus, endemic
 Carpobrotus pageae L.Bolus, accepted as Carpobrotus mellei (L.Bolus) L.Bolus, present
 Carpobrotus pillansii L.Bolus, accepted as Carpobrotus mellei (L.Bolus) L.Bolus, present
 Carpobrotus quadrifidus L.Bolus, endemic
 Carpobrotus quadrifidus L.Bolus forma rosea (L.Bolus) G.D.Rowley, accepted as Carpobrotus quadrifidus L.Bolus, present
 Carpobrotus quadrifidus L.Bolus var. rosea L.Bolus, accepted as Carpobrotus quadrifidus L.Bolus, present
 Carpobrotus rubrocinctus (Haw.) N.E.Br. accepted as Carpobrotus acinaciformis (L.) L.Bolus, present
 Carpobrotus sauerae Schwantes, accepted as Carpobrotus quadrifidus L.Bolus, present
 Carpobrotus subulatus (Haw.) N.E.Br. accepted as Carpobrotus acinaciformis (L.) L.Bolus, present
 Carpobrotus vanzijliae L.Bolus, accepted as Carpobrotus acinaciformis (L.) L.Bolus, present

Carruanthus 
Genus Carruanthus:
 Carruanthus peersii L.Bolus, endemic
 Carruanthus ringens (L.) Boom, endemic

Caryotophora 
Genus Caryotophora:
 Caryotophora skiatophytoides Leistner, endemic

Caulipsolon 
Genus Caulipsolon:
 Caulipsolon rapaceum (Jacq.) Klak, accepted as Mesembryanthemum rapaceum Jacq. endemic

Cephalophyllum 
Genus Cephalophyllum:
 Cephalophyllum alstonii Marloth ex L.Bolus, endemic
 Cephalophyllum apiculatum L.Bolus, accepted as Cephalophyllum loreum (L.) Schwantes, present
 Cephalophyllum aurantiacum L.Bolus, accepted as Cephalophyllum purpureo-album (Haw.) Schwantes, present
 Cephalophyllum aureorubrum L.Bolus, accepted as Cephalophyllum rigidum L.Bolus, present
 Cephalophyllum ausense L.Bolus, accepted as Cephalophyllum ebracteatum (Pax ex Schltr. & Diels) Dinter & Schwantes
 Cephalophyllum baylissii L.Bolus, accepted as Cephalophyllum diversiphyllum (Haw.) H.E.K.Hartmann, present
 Cephalophyllum bredasdorpense L.Bolus, accepted as Cephalophyllum diversiphyllum (Haw.) H.E.K.Hartmann, present
 Cephalophyllum brevifolium L.Bolus, accepted as Cephalophyllum pulchellum L.Bolus, present
 Cephalophyllum caespitosum H.E.K.Hartmann, endemic
 Cephalophyllum caledonicum L.Bolus, accepted as Cephalophyllum diversiphyllum (Haw.) H.E.K.Hartmann, present
 Cephalophyllum cauliculatum (Haw.) N.E.Br. accepted as Cephalophyllum diversiphyllum (Haw.) H.E.K.Hartmann, present
 Cephalophyllum cedrimontanum L.Bolus, accepted as Cephalophyllum loreum (L.) Schwantes, present
 Cephalophyllum ceresianum L.Bolus, accepted as Cephalophyllum corniculatum (L.) Schwantes, present
 Cephalophyllum compactum L.Bolus, accepted as Cephalophyllum loreum (L.) Schwantes, present
 Cephalophyllum conicum L.Bolus ex H.Jacobsen, accepted as Cephalophyllum curtophyllum (L.Bolus) Schwantes, present
 Cephalophyllum corniculatum (L.) Schwantes, endemic
 Cephalophyllum crassum L.Bolus, accepted as Cephalophyllum tricolorum (Haw.) Schwantes, present
 Cephalophyllum curtophyllum (L.Bolus) Schwantes, endemic
 Cephalophyllum decipiens (Haw.) L.Bolus, accepted as Cephalophyllum loreum (L.) Schwantes, present
 Cephalophyllum diminutum (Haw.) L.Bolus, accepted as Cephalophyllum subulatoides (Haw.) N.E.Br. present
 Cephalophyllum diversiphyllum (Haw.) H.E.K.Hartmann, endemic
 Cephalophyllum ebracteatum (Pax ex Schltr. & Diels) Dinter & Schwantes, indigenous
 Cephalophyllum ernii L.Bolus, accepted as Cephalophyllum ebracteatum (Pax ex Schltr. & Diels) Dinter & Schwantes
 Cephalophyllum framesii L.Bolus, endemic
 Cephalophyllum franciscii L.Bolus, accepted as Cephalophyllum alstonii Marloth ex L.Bolus, present
 Cephalophyllum fulleri L.Bolus, endemic
 Cephalophyllum goodii L.Bolus, endemic
 Cephalophyllum gracile L.Bolus, accepted as Cephalophyllum purpureo-album (Haw.) Schwantes, present
 Cephalophyllum gracile L.Bolus var. longisepalum L.Bolus, accepted as Cephalophyllum purpureo-album (Haw.) Schwantes, present
 Cephalophyllum griseum (S.A.Hammer & U.Schmiedel) H.E.K.Hartmann, endemic
 Cephalophyllum hallii L.Bolus, endemic
 Cephalophyllum herrei L.Bolus, indigenous
 Cephalophyllum herrei L.Bolus var. decumbens L.Bolus, accepted as Cephalophyllum numeesense H.E.K.Hartmann, present
 Cephalophyllum inaequale L.Bolus, endemic
 Cephalophyllum insigne L.Bolus, accepted as Cephalophyllum rigidum L.Bolus, present
 Cephalophyllum kliprandense L.Bolus, accepted as Cephalophyllum parvibracteatum (L.Bolus) H.E.K.Hartmann, present
 Cephalophyllum laetulum L.Bolus, accepted as Cephalophyllum ebracteatum (Pax ex Schltr. & Diels) Dinter & Schwantes, present
 Cephalophyllum littlewoodii L.Bolus, accepted as Cephalophyllum purpureo-album (Haw.) Schwantes, present
 Cephalophyllum loreum (L.) Schwantes, endemic
 Cephalophyllum maritimum (L.Bolus) Schwantes, accepted as Jordaaniella maritima (L.Bolus) Van Jaarsv. indigenous
 Cephalophyllum middlemostii L.Bolus, accepted as Cephalophyllum purpureo-album (Haw.) Schwantes, present
 Cephalophyllum namaquanum L.Bolus, accepted as Cephalophyllum ebracteatum (Pax ex Schltr. & Diels) Dinter & Schwantes, present
 Cephalophyllum niveum L.Bolus, endemic
 Cephalophyllum numeesense H.E.K.Hartmann, endemic
 Cephalophyllum pallens L.Bolus, accepted as Cephalophyllum herrei L.Bolus
 Cephalophyllum parvibracteatum (L.Bolus) H.E.K.Hartmann, endemic
 Cephalophyllum parviflorum L.Bolus, endemic
 Cephalophyllum parviflorum L.Bolus var. proliferum L.Bolus, accepted as Cephalophyllum parviflorum L.Bolus, present
 Cephalophyllum parvulum (Schltr.) H.E.K.Hartmann, endemic
 Cephalophyllum paucifolium L.Bolus, accepted as Cephalophyllum purpureo-album (Haw.) Schwantes, present
 Cephalophyllum pillansii L.Bolus, endemic
 Cephalophyllum pillansii L.Bolus var. grandiflorum L.Bolus, accepted as Cephalophyllum pillansii L.Bolus, present
 Cephalophyllum primulinum (L.Bolus) Schwantes, accepted as Cephalophyllum loreum (L.) Schwantes, present
 Cephalophyllum pulchellum L.Bolus, endemic
 Cephalophyllum pulchrum L.Bolus, endemic
 Cephalophyllum purpureo-album (Haw.) Schwantes, endemic
 Cephalophyllum rangei (Engl.) L.Bolus ex H.Jacobsen, accepted as Cephalophyllum ebracteatum (Pax ex Schltr. & Diels) Dinter & Schwantes, present
 Cephalophyllum regale L.Bolus, endemic
 Cephalophyllum rigidum L.Bolus, endemic
 Cephalophyllum roseum (L.Bolus) L.Bolus, accepted as Leipoldtia rosea L.Bolus, present
 Cephalophyllum rostellum (L.Bolus) H.E.K.Hartmann, endemic
 Cephalophyllum serrulatum L.Bolus, accepted as Cephalophyllum purpureo-album (Haw.) Schwantes, present
 Cephalophyllum spissum H.E.K.Hartmann, endemic
 Cephalophyllum spongiosum (L.Bolus) L.Bolus, accepted as Jordaaniella spongiosa (L.Bolus) H.E.K.Hartmann, present
 Cephalophyllum staminodiosum L.Bolus, endemic
 Cephalophyllum stayneri L.Bolus, accepted as Cephalophyllum framesii L.Bolus, present
 Cephalophyllum subulatoides (Haw.) N.E.Br. endemic
 Cephalophyllum tenuifolium L.Bolus, accepted as Cephalophyllum tricolorum (Haw.) Schwantes, present
 Cephalophyllum tetrastichum H.E.K.Hartmann, endemic
 Cephalophyllum tricolorum (Haw.) Schwantes, endemic
 Cephalophyllum truncatum L.Bolus, accepted as Cephalophyllum niveum L.Bolus, present
 Cephalophyllum validum (Haw.) Schwantes, accepted as Ruschia vetovalida H.E.K.Hartmann, present
 Cephalophyllum vandermerwei L.Bolus, accepted as Cephalophyllum diversiphyllum (Haw.) H.E.K.Hartmann, present
 Cephalophyllum vanheerdei L.Bolus, accepted as Cephalophyllum regale L.Bolus, present
 Cephalophyllum worcesterense L.Bolus, accepted as Cephalophyllum purpureo-album (Haw.) Schwantes, present

Cerochlamys 
Genus Cerochlamys:
 Cerochlamys gemina (L.Bolus) H.E.K.Hartmann, endemic
 Cerochlamys pachyphylla (L.Bolus) L.Bolus, endemic
 Cerochlamys purpureostyla (L.Bolus) H.E.K.Hartmann, accepted as Acrodon purpureostylus (L.Bolus) Burgoyne, indigenous
 Cerochlamys trigona N.E.Br. endemic

Chasmatophyllum 
Genus Chasmatophyllum:
 Chasmatophyllum braunsii Schwantes, endemic
 Chasmatophyllum braunsii Schwantes var. majus L.Bolus, accepted as Chasmatophyllum braunsii Schwantes, present
 Chasmatophyllum maninum L.Bolus, endemic
 Chasmatophyllum musculinum (Haw.) Dinter & Schwantes, indigenous
 Chasmatophyllum nelii Schwantes, endemic
 Chasmatophyllum rouxii L.Bolus, endemic
 Chasmatophyllum stanleyi (L.Bolus) H.E.K.Hartmann, endemic
 Chasmatophyllum verdoorniae (N.E.Br.) L.Bolus, endemic
 Chasmatophyllum willowmorense (L.Bolus) L.Bolus, endemic

Cheiridopsis 
Genus Cheiridopsis:
 Cheiridopsis acuminata L.Bolus, endemic
 Cheiridopsis alba-oculata Klak & Helme, endemic
 Cheiridopsis amabilis S.A.Hammer, endemic
 Cheiridopsis aspera L.Bolus, endemic
 Cheiridopsis brownii Schick & Tischer, indigenous
 Cheiridopsis campanulata G.Will. endemic
 Cheiridopsis cigarettifera (A.Berger) N.E.Br. accepted as Cheiridopsis namaquensis (Sond.) H.E.K.Hartmann [1], present
 Cheiridopsis delphinoides S.A.Hammer, endemic
 Cheiridopsis denticulata (Haw.) N.E.Br. endemic
 Cheiridopsis derenbergiana Schwantes, endemic
 Cheiridopsis gamoepensis S.A.Hammer, endemic
 Cheiridopsis glomerata S.A.Hammer, endemic
 Cheiridopsis herrei L.Bolus, endemic
 Cheiridopsis imitans L.Bolus, endemic
 Cheiridopsis meyeri N.E.Br. endemic
 Cheiridopsis minima Tischer, accepted as Antimima minima (Tischer) H.E.K.Hartmann, present
 Cheiridopsis minor (L.Bolus) H.E.K.Hartmann, endemic
 Cheiridopsis namaquensis (Sond.) H.E.K.Hartmann, endemic
 Cheiridopsis nelii Schwantes, endemic
 Cheiridopsis parvibracteata L.Bolus, accepted as Cephalophyllum parvibracteatum (L.Bolus) H.E.K.Hartmann, present
 Cheiridopsis pearsonii N.E.Br. endemic
 Cheiridopsis peculiaris N.E.Br. endemic
 Cheiridopsis pillansii L.Bolus, endemic
 Cheiridopsis pilosula L.Bolus, endemic
 Cheiridopsis ponderosa S.A.Hammer, endemic
 Cheiridopsis purpurata L.Bolus, accepted as Cheiridopsis purpurea L.Bolus, present
 Cheiridopsis purpurea L.Bolus, endemic
 Cheiridopsis robusta (Haw.) N.E.Br. indigenous
 Cheiridopsis rostrata (L.) N.E.Br. indigenous
 Cheiridopsis rudis L.Bolus, endemic
 Cheiridopsis schlechteri Tischer, endemic
 Cheiridopsis speciosa L.Bolus, endemic
 Cheiridopsis turbinata L.Bolus, endemic
 Cheiridopsis umbrosa S.A.Hammer & Desmet, endemic
 Cheiridopsis umdausensis L.Bolus, endemic
 Cheiridopsis velox S.A.Hammer, endemic
 Cheiridopsis verrucosa L.Bolus, endemic
 Cheiridopsis verrucosa L.Bolus var. minor L.Bolus, accepted as Cheiridopsis verrucosa L.Bolus, present

Circandra 
Genus Circandra:
 Circandra serrata (L.) N.E.Br. endemic

Cleretum 
Genus Cleretum:
 Cleretum apetalum (L.f.) N.E.Br. endemic
 Cleretum bellidiforme (Burm.f.) G.D.Rowley, endemic
 Cleretum booysenii (L.Bolus) Klak, endemic
 Cleretum bruynsii Klak, indigenous
 Cleretum clavatum (Haw.) Klak, endemic
 Cleretum herrei (Schwantes) Ihlenf. & Struck, endemic
 Cleretum lyratifolium Ihlenf. & Struck, endemic
 Cleretum maughanii (N.E.Br.) Klak, endemic
 Cleretum papulosum (L.f.) L.Bolus [2], indigenous
 Cleretum papulosum (L.f.) L.Bolus subsp. papulosum, endemic
 Cleretum papulosum (L.f.) L.Bolus subsp. schlechteri (Schwantes) Ihlenf. & Struck, endemic
 Cleretum patersonjonesii Klak, indigenous
 Cleretum puberulum (Haw.) N.E.Br. accepted as Mesembryanthemum aitonis Jacq. indigenous
 Cleretum rourkei (L.Bolus) Klak, endemic

Conicosia 
Genus Conicosia:
 Conicosia coruscans (Haw.) Schwantes, accepted as Conicosia elongata (Haw.) N.E.Br. present
 Conicosia elongata (Haw.) N.E.Br. endemic
 Conicosia pugioniformis (L.) N.E.Br. indigenous
 Conicosia pugioniformis (L.) N.E.Br. subsp. alborosea (L.Bolus) Ihlenf. & Gerbaulet, endemic
 Conicosia pugioniformis (L.) N.E.Br. subsp. muiri (N.E.Br.) Ihlenf. & Gerbaulet, endemic
 Conicosia pugioniformis (L.) N.E.Br. subsp. pugioniformis, endemic

Conophyllum 
Genus Conophyllum:
 Conophyllum globosum L.Bolus, accepted as Meyerophytum globosum (L.Bolus) Ihlenf. present

Conophytum 
Genus Conophytum:
 Conophytum absimile L.Bolus, accepted as Conophytum bilobum (Marloth) N.E.Br. subsp. bilobum var. bilobum, present
 Conophytum absimile L.Bolus forma umbrosum L.Bolus, accepted as Conophytum bilobum (Marloth) N.E.Br. subsp. bilobum var. bilobum, present
 Conophytum absimile L.Bolus var. major L.Bolus, accepted as Conophytum bilobum (Marloth) N.E.Br. subsp. bilobum var. bilobum, present
 Conophytum achabense S.A.Hammer, endemic
 Conophytum acutum L.Bolus, endemic
 Conophytum admiraalii L.Bolus, accepted as Conophytum jucundum (N.E.Br.) N.E.Br. subsp. jucundum, present
 Conophytum advenum N.E.Br. accepted as Conophytum piluliforme (N.E.Br.) N.E.Br. subsp. piluliforme, present
 Conophytum aequale L.Bolus, accepted as Conophytum bilobum (Marloth) N.E.Br. subsp. bilobum var. bilobum, present
 Conophytum aequatum L.Bolus, accepted as Conophytum pageae (N.E.Br.) N.E.Br. present
 Conophytum aggregatum (Haw. ex N.E.Br.) N.E.Br. accepted as Conophytum piluliforme (N.E.Br.) N.E.Br. subsp. piluliforme, present
 Conophytum albertense (N.E.Br.) N.E.Br. accepted as Conophytum truncatum (Thunb.) N.E.Br. subsp. truncatum var. truncatum, present
 Conophytum albescens N.E.Br. accepted as Conophytum bilobum (Marloth) N.E.Br. subsp. bilobum var. bilobum, present
 Conophytum albifissum Tischer, accepted as Conophytum minimum (Haw.) N.E.Br. present
 Conophytum albiflorum (Rawe) S.A.Hammer, endemic
 Conophytum altile (N.E.Br.) N.E.Br. accepted as Conophytum ficiforme (Haw.) N.E.Br. present
 Conophytum altum L.Bolus, accepted as Conophytum bilobum (Marloth) N.E.Br. subsp. altum (L.Bolus) S.A.Hammer, present
 Conophytum altum L.Bolus var. plenum L.Bolus, accepted as Conophytum bilobum (Marloth) N.E.Br. subsp. altum (L.Bolus) S.A.Hammer, present
 Conophytum ampliatum L.Bolus, accepted as Conophytum bilobum (Marloth) N.E.Br. subsp. bilobum var. bilobum, present
 Conophytum amplum L.Bolus, accepted as Conophytum bilobum (Marloth) N.E.Br. subsp. bilobum var. bilobum, present
 Conophytum andausanum N.E.Br. accepted as Conophytum bilobum (Marloth) N.E.Br. subsp. bilobum var. bilobum, present
 Conophytum andausanum N.E.Br. var. immaculatum L.Bolus, accepted as Conophytum bilobum (Marloth) N.E.Br. subsp. bilobum var. bilobum, present
 Conophytum angelicae (Dinter & Schwantes) N.E.Br. indigenous
 Conophytum angelicae (Dinter & Schwantes) N.E.Br. subsp. angelicae, indigenous
 Conophytum angelicae (Dinter & Schwantes) N.E.Br. subsp. tetragonum Rawe & S.A.Hammer, endemic
 Conophytum angustum L.Bolus, accepted as Conophytum bilobum (Marloth) N.E.Br. subsp. bilobum var. bilobum, present
 Conophytum angustum N.E.Br. accepted as Conophytum bilobum (Marloth) N.E.Br. subsp. bilobum var. bilobum, present
 Conophytum anjametae de Boer, accepted as Conophytum violaciflorum Schick & Tischer, present
 Conophytum antonii S.A.Hammer, indigenous
 Conophytum apiatum (N.E.Br.) N.E.Br. accepted as Conophytum bilobum (Marloth) N.E.Br. subsp. bilobum var. bilobum, present
 Conophytum apiculatum N.E.Br. accepted as Conophytum bilobum (Marloth) N.E.Br. subsp. bilobum var. bilobum, present
 Conophytum approximatum Lavis, accepted as Conophytum bilobum (Marloth) N.E.Br. subsp. bilobum var. bilobum
 Conophytum archeri Lavis, accepted as Conophytum piluliforme (N.E.Br.) N.E.Br. subsp. piluliforme, present
 Conophytum archeri Lavis var. stayneri L.Bolus, accepted as Conophytum truncatum (Thunb.) N.E.Br. subsp. viridicatum (N.E.Br.) S.A.Hammer, present
 Conophytum areolatum Littlew. accepted as Conophytum pellucidum Schwantes subsp. pellucidum var. pellucidum, present
 Conophytum armianum S.A.Hammer, endemic
 Conophytum arthurolfago S.A.Hammer, endemic
 Conophytum asperulum L.Bolus, accepted as Conophytum bilobum (Marloth) N.E.Br. subsp. bilobum var. bilobum, present
 Conophytum asperulum L.Bolus var. brevistylum L.Bolus, accepted as Conophytum bilobum (Marloth) N.E.Br. subsp. bilobum var. bilobum, present
 Conophytum assimile (N.E.Br.) N.E.Br. accepted as Conophytum ficiforme (Haw.) N.E.Br. present
 Conophytum astylum L.Bolus, accepted as Conophytum pellucidum Schwantes subsp. cupreatum (Tischer) S.A.Hammer var. cupreatum, present
 Conophytum auctum N.E.Br. accepted as Conophytum bilobum (Marloth) N.E.Br. subsp. bilobum var. bilobum, present
 Conophytum auctum N.E.Br. forma approximatum (Lavis) Rawe, accepted as Conophytum bilobum (Marloth) N.E.Br. subsp. bilobum var. bilobum, present
 Conophytum auriflorum Tischer, indigenous
 Conophytum auriflorum Tischer subsp. auriflorum, endemic
 Conophytum auriflorum Tischer subsp. turbiniforme (Rawe) S.A.Hammer, endemic
 Conophytum avenantii L.Bolus, accepted as Conophytum jucundum (N.E.Br.) N.E.Br. subsp. fragile (Tischer) S.A.Hammer, present
 Conophytum bachelorum S.A.Hammer, endemic
 Conophytum bachelorum S.A.Hammer subsp. sponsaliorum S.A.Hammer, accepted as Conophytum obscurum N.E.Br. subsp. sponsaliorum (S.A.Hammer) S.A.Hammer, present
 Conophytum barbatum L.Bolus, accepted as Conophytum obscurum N.E.Br. subsp. barbatum (L.Bolus) S.A.Hammer, present
 Conophytum batesii N.E.Br. accepted as Conophytum minimum (Haw.) N.E.Br. present
 Conophytum bicarinatum L.Bolus, endemic
 Conophytum bilobum (Marloth) N.E.Br. indigenous
 Conophytum bilobum (Marloth) N.E.Br. subsp. altum (L.Bolus) S.A.Hammer, endemic
 Conophytum bilobum (Marloth) N.E.Br. subsp. bilobum var. bilobum, indigenous
 Conophytum bilobum (Marloth) N.E.Br. subsp. bilobum var. elishae, endemic
 Conophytum bilobum (Marloth) N.E.Br. subsp. bilobum var. linearilucidum, endemic
 Conophytum bilobum (Marloth) N.E.Br. subsp. bilobum var. muscosipapillatum, endemic
 Conophytum bilobum (Marloth) N.E.Br. subsp. claviferens S.A.Hammer, endemic
 Conophytum bilobum (Marloth) N.E.Br. subsp. gracilistylum (L.Bolus) S.A.Hammer, endemic
 Conophytum blandum L.Bolus, endemic
 Conophytum bolusiae Schwantes, indigenous
 Conophytum bolusiae Schwantes subsp. bolusiae, endemic
 Conophytum bolusiae Schwantes subsp. primavernum S.A.Hammer, endemic
 Conophytum boreale L.Bolus, accepted as Conophytum lithopsoides L.Bolus subsp. boreale (L.Bolus) S.A.Hammer, present
 Conophytum braunsii Tischer, accepted as Conophytum minutum (Haw.) N.E.Br. var. pearsonii (N.E.Br.) Boom, present
 Conophytum breve N.E.Br. endemic
 Conophytum breve N.E.Br. var. minor L.Bolus, accepted as Conophytum breve N.E.Br. present
 Conophytum breve N.E.Br. var. minutiflorum (Schwantes) Rawe, accepted as Conophytum pageae (N.E.Br.) N.E.Br. present
 Conophytum breve N.E.Br. var. vanzylii (Lavis) Rawe, accepted as Conophytum calculus (A.Berger) N.E.Br. subsp. vanzylii (Lavis) S.A.Hammer, present
 Conophytum brevilineatum Tischer, accepted as Conophytum minimum (Haw.) N.E.Br. present
 Conophytum brevipes L.Bolus, accepted as Conophytum wettsteinii (A.Berger) N.E.Br. present
 Conophytum brevipetalum Lavis, accepted as Conophytum piluliforme (N.E.Br.) N.E.Br. subsp. piluliforme, present
 Conophytum brevisectum L.Bolus, accepted as Conophytum bilobum (Marloth) N.E.Br. subsp. bilobum var. bilobum, present
 Conophytum brunneum S.A.Hammer, endemic
 Conophytum bruynsii S.A.Hammer, endemic
 Conophytum burgeri L.Bolus, endemic
 Conophytum buysianum A.R.Mitch. & S.A.Hammer, accepted as Conophytum reconditum A.R.Mitch. subsp. buysianum (A.R.Mitch. & S.A.Hammer) S.A.Hammer, present
 Conophytum calculus (A.Berger) N.E.Br. indigenous
 Conophytum calculus (A.Berger) N.E.Br. subsp. calculus, endemic
 Conophytum calculus (A.Berger) N.E.Br. subsp. vanzylii (Lavis) S.A.Hammer, endemic
 Conophytum calculus (A.Berger) N.E.Br. var. komkansicum (L.Bolus) Rawe, accepted as Conophytum calculus (A.Berger) N.E.Br. subsp. calculus, present
 Conophytum calculus (A.Berger) N.E.Br. var. protusum L.Bolus, accepted as Conophytum pageae (N.E.Br.) N.E.Br. present
 Conophytum calitzdorpense L.Bolus, accepted as Conophytum truncatum (Thunb.) N.E.Br. subsp. truncatum var. wiggettiae, present
 Conophytum calitzdorpense Tischer, accepted as Conophytum truncatum (Thunb.) N.E.Br. subsp. truncatum var. wiggettiae, present
 Conophytum caroli Lavis, endemic
 Conophytum carpianum L.Bolus, endemic
 Conophytum catervum (N.E.Br.) N.E.Br. accepted as Conophytum truncatum (Thunb.) N.E.Br. subsp. viridicatum (N.E.Br.) S.A.Hammer, present
 Conophytum cauliferum N.E.Br. accepted as Conophytum bilobum (Marloth) N.E.Br. subsp. bilobum var. bilobum, present
 Conophytum cauliferum N.E.Br. var. lekkersingense L.Bolus, accepted as Conophytum bilobum (Marloth) N.E.Br. subsp. bilobum var. bilobum, present
 Conophytum ceresianum L.Bolus, accepted as Conophytum obcordellum (Haw.) N.E.Br. subsp. obcordellum var. ceresianum, present
 Conophytum chauviniae (Schwantes) S.A.Hammer, endemic
 Conophytum chloratum Tischer, accepted as Conophytum ectypum N.E.Br. subsp. ectypum, present
 Conophytum chrisocruxum S.A.Hammer, endemic
 Conophytum chrisolum S.A.Hammer, endemic
 Conophytum christiansenianum L.Bolus, accepted as Conophytum bilobum (Marloth) N.E.Br. subsp. bilobum var. bilobum, present
 Conophytum cibdelum N.E.Br. accepted as Conophytum truncatum (Thunb.) N.E.Br. subsp. truncatum var. truncatum, present
 Conophytum circumpunctatum Schick & Tischer, accepted as Conophytum wettsteinii (A.Berger) N.E.Br. present
 Conophytum citrinum L.Bolus, accepted as Conophytum bilobum (Marloth) N.E.Br. subsp. bilobum var. bilobum, present
 Conophytum compressum N.E.Br. accepted as Conophytum bilobum (Marloth) N.E.Br. subsp. bilobum var. bilobum, present
 Conophytum comptonii N.E.Br. endemic
 Conophytum concavum L.Bolus, endemic
 Conophytum concinnum Schwantes, accepted as Conophytum flavum N.E.Br. subsp. flavum, present
 Conophytum concordans G.D.Rowley, endemic
 Conophytum confusum A.J.Young, Rogerson, S.A.Hammer & Opel, endemic
 Conophytum connatum L.Bolus, accepted as Conophytum bilobum (Marloth) N.E.Br. subsp. altum (L.Bolus) S.A.Hammer, present
 Conophytum conradii L.Bolus, accepted as Conophytum bilobum (Marloth) N.E.Br. subsp. bilobum var. bilobum, present
 Conophytum convexum L.Bolus, accepted as Conophytum bilobum (Marloth) N.E.Br. subsp. bilobum var. bilobum, present
 Conophytum corculum Schwantes, accepted as Conophytum meyeri N.E.Br. present
 Conophytum cordatum Schick & Tischer, accepted as Conophytum bilobum (Marloth) N.E.Br. subsp. bilobum var. bilobum, present
 Conophytum cordatum Schick & Tischer var. macrostigma L.Bolus, accepted as Conophytum bilobum (Marloth) N.E.Br. subsp. bilobum var. bilobum, present
 Conophytum coriaceum L.Bolus, accepted as Conophytum bilobum (Marloth) N.E.Br. subsp. bilobum var. bilobum, present
 Conophytum corniferum Schick & Tischer, accepted as Conophytum bilobum (Marloth) N.E.Br. subsp. altum (L.Bolus) S.A.Hammer, present
 Conophytum crassum L.Bolus, accepted as Conophytum bilobum (Marloth) N.E.Br. subsp. bilobum var. bilobum, present
 Conophytum crateriforme A.J.Young, Rogerson, Harrower & S.A.Hammer, endemic
 Conophytum cubicum Pavelka, endemic
 Conophytum cupreatum Tischer, accepted as Conophytum pellucidum Schwantes subsp. cupreatum (Tischer) S.A.Hammer var. cupreatum, present
 Conophytum cupreiflorum Tischer, endemic
 Conophytum curtum L.Bolus, accepted as Conophytum bilobum (Marloth) N.E.Br. subsp. bilobum var. bilobum, present
 Conophytum cylindratum Schwantes, accepted as Conophytum roodiae N.E.Br. subsp. cylindratum (Schwantes) Smale, present
 Conophytum cylindratum Schwantes var. primosii (Lavis) Rawe, accepted as Conophytum roodiae N.E.Br. subsp. cylindratum (Schwantes) Smale, present
 Conophytum declinatum L.Bolus, accepted as Conophytum obcordellum (Haw.) N.E.Br. subsp. obcordellum var. obcordellum, present
 Conophytum decoratum N.E.Br. accepted as Conophytum uviforme (Haw.) N.E.Br. subsp. decoratum (N.E.Br.) S.A.Hammer, present
 Conophytum dennisii N.E.Br. accepted as Conophytum bilobum (Marloth) N.E.Br. subsp. bilobum var. bilobum, present
 Conophytum densipunctum L.Bolus, accepted as Conophytum quaesitum (N.E.Br.) N.E.Br. subsp. densipunctum (L.Bolus) S.A.Hammer, present
 Conophytum depressum Lavis, indigenous
 Conophytum depressum Lavis subsp. depressum, endemic
 Conophytum depressum Lavis subsp. perdurans S.A.Hammer, endemic
 Conophytum devium G.D.Rowley, indigenous
 Conophytum devium G.D.Rowley subsp. devium, endemic
 Conophytum devium G.D.Rowley subsp. stiriferum S.A.Hammer & Barnhill, endemic
 Conophytum difforme L.Bolus, accepted as Conophytum bilobum (Marloth) N.E.Br. subsp. bilobum var. bilobum, present
 Conophytum dilatatum Tischer, accepted as Conophytum bilobum (Marloth) N.E.Br. subsp. bilobum var. bilobum, present
 Conophytum discrepans G.D.Rowley, accepted as Conophytum maughanii N.E.Br. subsp. latum (Tischer) S.A.Hammer, present
 Conophytum discrepans G.D.Rowley forma rubrum (Tischer) G.D.Rowley, accepted as Conophytum maughanii N.E.Br. subsp. latum (Tischer) S.A.Hammer, present
 Conophytum dispar N.E.Br. accepted as Conophytum truncatum (Thunb.) N.E.Br. subsp. viridicatum (N.E.Br.) S.A.Hammer, present
 Conophytum dissimile L.Bolus, accepted as Conophytum bilobum (Marloth) N.E.Br. subsp. bilobum var. bilobum, present
 Conophytum distans L.Bolus, accepted as Conophytum bilobum (Marloth) N.E.Br. subsp. bilobum var. bilobum, present
 Conophytum divaricatum N.E.Br. accepted as Conophytum bilobum (Marloth) N.E.Br. subsp. bilobum var. bilobum, present
 Conophytum diversum N.E.Br. accepted as Conophytum bilobum (Marloth) N.E.Br. subsp. bilobum var. bilobum, present
 Conophytum dolomiticum Tischer, accepted as Conophytum bilobum (Marloth) N.E.Br. subsp. bilobum var. bilobum, present
 Conophytum doornense N.E.Br. accepted as Conophytum breve N.E.Br. present
 Conophytum ecarinatum L.Bolus var. angustum L.Bolus, accepted as Conophytum bilobum (Marloth) N.E.Br. subsp. bilobum var. bilobum, present
 Conophytum ecarinatum L.Bolus var. candidum (L.Bolus) Rawe, accepted as Conophytum meyeri N.E.Br. present
 Conophytum ectypum N.E.Br. indigenous
 Conophytum ectypum N.E.Br. subsp. brownii (Tischer) S.A.Hammer, endemic
 Conophytum ectypum N.E.Br. subsp. cruciatum S.A.Hammer, endemic
 Conophytum ectypum N.E.Br. subsp. ectypum, endemic
 Conophytum ectypum N.E.Br. subsp. ectypum var. brownii, accepted as Conophytum ectypum N.E.Br. subsp. brownii (Tischer) S.A.Hammer, present
 Conophytum ectypum N.E.Br. subsp. ignavum S.A.Hammer, endemic
 Conophytum ectypum N.E.Br. subsp. sulcatum (L.Bolus) S.A.Hammer, endemic
 Conophytum ectypum N.E.Br. var. limbatum (N.E.Br.) Tischer, accepted as Conophytum ectypum N.E.Br. subsp. ectypum, present
 Conophytum ectypum N.E.Br. var. tischleri (Schwantes) Tischer, accepted as Conophytum ectypum N.E.Br. subsp. ectypum, present
 Conophytum edithiae N.E.Br. accepted as Conophytum subfenestratum Schwantes, present
 Conophytum edwardii Schwantes, accepted as Conophytum piluliforme (N.E.Br.) N.E.Br. subsp. edwardii (Schwantes) S.A.Hammer, present
 Conophytum edwardsiae Lavis, accepted as Conophytum luckhoffii Lavis, present
 Conophytum edwardsiae Lavis var. albiflorum Rawe, accepted as Conophytum albiflorum (Rawe) S.A.Hammer, present
 Conophytum eenkokerense L.Bolus, accepted as Conophytum tantillum N.E.Br. subsp. eenkokerense (L.Bolus) S.A.Hammer, present
 Conophytum elegans N.E.Br. accepted as Conophytum pellucidum Schwantes subsp. pellucidum var. pellucidum, present
 Conophytum elishae (N.E.Br.) N.E.Br. accepted as Conophytum bilobum (Marloth) N.E.Br. subsp. bilobum var. elishae, present
 Conophytum ellipticum Tischer, accepted as Conophytum flavum N.E.Br. subsp. novicium (N.E.Br.) S.A.Hammer, present
 Conophytum elongatum Schick & Tischer, accepted as Conophytum hians N.E.Br. present
 Conophytum ernianum Loesch & Tischer, accepted as Conophytum taylorianum (Dinter & Schwantes) N.E.Br. subsp. ernianum (Loesch & Tischer) de Boer ex S. present
 Conophytum ernstii S.A.Hammer, indigenous
 Conophytum ernstii S.A.Hammer subsp. ernstii, endemic
 Conophytum etaylorii Schwantes, accepted as Conophytum piluliforme (N.E.Br.) N.E.Br. subsp. piluliforme, present
 Conophytum excisum L.Bolus, accepted as Conophytum bilobum (Marloth) N.E.Br. subsp. bilobum var. bilobum, present
 Conophytum exiguum N.E.Br. accepted as Conophytum saxetanum (N.E.Br.) N.E.Br. present
 Conophytum exsertum N.E.Br. accepted as Conophytum bilobum (Marloth) N.E.Br. subsp. bilobum var. bilobum, present
 Conophytum fenestratum Schwantes, accepted as Conophytum pellucidum Schwantes subsp. pellucidum var. pellucidum, present
 Conophytum fibuliforme (Haw.) N.E.Br. endemic
 Conophytum ficiforme (Haw.) N.E.Br. endemic
 Conophytum ficiforme (Haw.) N.E.Br. var. placitum (N.E.Br.) Rawe, accepted as Conophytum ficiforme (Haw.) N.E.Br. present
 Conophytum flavum N.E.Br. endemic
 Conophytum flavum N.E.Br. subsp. flavum, endemic
 Conophytum flavum N.E.Br. subsp. novicium (N.E.Br.) S.A.Hammer, endemic
 Conophytum flavum N.E.Br. subsp. novicium (N.E.Br.) S.A.Hammer var. kosiesense, endemic
 Conophytum flavum N.E.Br. subsp. novicium (N.E.Br.) S.A.Hammer var. novicium, endemic
 Conophytum flavum N.E.Br. var. luteum (N.E.Br.) Boom, accepted as Conophytum flavum N.E.Br. subsp. flavum, present
 Conophytum forresteri L.Bolus, accepted as Conophytum pageae (N.E.Br.) N.E.Br. present
 Conophytum fossulatum Tischer, accepted as Conophytum ficiforme (Haw.) N.E.Br. present
 Conophytum fragile Tischer, accepted as Conophytum jucundum (N.E.Br.) N.E.Br. subsp. fragile (Tischer) S.A.Hammer, present
 Conophytum framesii Lavis, accepted as Conophytum uviforme (Haw.) N.E.Br. subsp. uviforme, present
 Conophytum francisci L.Bolus, accepted as Conophytum uviforme (Haw.) N.E.Br. subsp. uviforme, present
 Conophytum francoiseae (S.A.Hammer) S.A.Hammer, endemic
 Conophytum fraternum (N.E.Br.) N.E.Br. endemic
 Conophytum fraternum (N.E.Br.) N.E.Br. var. leptanthum (L.Bolus) L.Bolus, accepted as Conophytum jucundum (N.E.Br.) N.E.Br. subsp. marlothii (N.E.Br.) S.A.Hammer, present
 Conophytum friedrichiae (Dinter) Schwantes, indigenous
 Conophytum frutescens Schwantes, endemic
 Conophytum fulleri L.Bolus, endemic
 Conophytum geometricum Lavis, accepted as Conophytum violaciflorum Schick & Tischer, present
 Conophytum geyeri L.Bolus, accepted as Conophytum jucundum (N.E.Br.) N.E.Br. subsp. jucundum, present
 Conophytum globosum (N.E.Br.) N.E.Br. endemic
 Conophytum globosum (N.E.Br.) N.E.Br. var. vanbredae (L.Bolus) Rawe, accepted as Conophytum globosum (N.E.Br.) N.E.Br. present
 Conophytum gonapense L.Bolus, accepted as Conophytum bilobum (Marloth) N.E.Br. subsp. bilobum var. bilobum, present
 Conophytum gonapense L.Bolus var. numeesicum L.Bolus, accepted as Conophytum bilobum (Marloth) N.E.Br. subsp. bilobum var. bilobum, present
 Conophytum gracile N.E.Br. accepted as Conophytum bilobum (Marloth) N.E.Br. subsp. altum (L.Bolus) S.A.Hammer, present
 Conophytum gracile N.E.Br. var. majusculum L.Bolus, accepted as Conophytum bilobum (Marloth) N.E.Br. subsp. altum (L.Bolus) S.A.Hammer, present
 Conophytum graciliramosum L.Bolus, accepted as Conophytum bilobum (Marloth) N.E.Br. subsp. altum (L.Bolus) S.A.Hammer, present
 Conophytum gracilistylum (L.Bolus) N.E.Br. accepted as Conophytum bilobum (Marloth) N.E.Br. subsp. gracilistylum (L.Bolus) S.A.Hammer, present
 Conophytum graessneri Tischer, accepted as Conophytum saxetanum (N.E.Br.) N.E.Br. present
 Conophytum grandiflorum L.Bolus, accepted as Conophytum bilobum (Marloth) N.E.Br. subsp. bilobum var. bilobum, present
 Conophytum gratum (N.E.Br.) N.E.Br. accepted as Conophytum jucundum (N.E.Br.) N.E.Br.
 Conophytum gratum (N.E.Br.) N.E.Br. subsp. marlothii (N.E.Br.) S.A.Hammer, accepted as Conophytum jucundum (N.E.Br.) N.E.Br. subsp. marlothii (N.E.Br.) S.A.Hammer, present
 Conophytum hallii L.Bolus, accepted as Conophytum roodiae N.E.Br. subsp. roodiae, present
 Conophytum hammeri G.Will. & H.C.Kenn. endemic
 Conophytum haramoepense (L.Bolus) G.D.Rowley, accepted as Conophytum lydiae (H.Jacobsen) G.D.Rowley, present
 Conophytum haramoepense L.Bolus, accepted as Conophytum marginatum Lavis subsp. haramoepense (L.Bolus) S.A.Hammer, present
 Conophytum heleniae Rawe, accepted as Conophytum tantillum N.E.Br. subsp. heleniae (Rawe) S.A.Hammer, present
 Conophytum helmutii Lavis, accepted as Conophytum stephanii Schwantes subsp. helmutii (Lavis) S.A.Hammer, present
 Conophytum hermarium (S.A.Hammer) S.A.Hammer, indigenous
 Conophytum herreanthus S.A.Hammer, indigenous
 Conophytum herreanthus S.A.Hammer subsp. herreanthus, endemic
 Conophytum herreanthus S.A.Hammer subsp. rex S.A.Hammer, endemic
 Conophytum herrei Schwantes, accepted as Conophytum minusculum (N.E.Br.) N.E.Br. subsp. minusculum, present
 Conophytum hians N.E.Br. endemic
 Conophytum hians N.E.Br. var. acuminatum L.Bolus, accepted as Conophytum hians N.E.Br. present
 Conophytum hillii L.Bolus, accepted as Conophytum uviforme (Haw.) N.E.Br. subsp. uviforme, present
 Conophytum hirtum Schwantes, accepted as Conophytum hians N.E.Br. present
 Conophytum hirtum Schwantes var. baradii Rawe, accepted as Conophytum klinghardtense Rawe subsp. baradii (Rawe) S.A.Hammer
 Conophytum hyracis S.A.Hammer, indigenous
 Conophytum inclusum L.Bolus, accepted as Conophytum bilobum (Marloth) N.E.Br. subsp. bilobum var. bilobum, present
 Conophytum incurvum N.E.Br. accepted as Conophytum bilobum (Marloth) N.E.Br. subsp. bilobum var. bilobum, present
 Conophytum incurvum N.E.Br. var. leucanthum (Lavis) Tischer, accepted as Conophytum bilobum (Marloth) N.E.Br. subsp. bilobum var. bilobum, present
 Conophytum indefinitum L.Bolus, accepted as Conophytum bilobum (Marloth) N.E.Br. subsp. bilobum var. bilobum, present
 Conophytum indutum L.Bolus, accepted as Conophytum jucundum (N.E.Br.) N.E.Br. subsp. jucundum, present
 Conophytum inornatum N.E.Br. endemic
 Conophytum insigne L.Bolus, accepted as Conophytum bilobum (Marloth) N.E.Br. subsp. bilobum var. bilobum, present
 Conophytum intermedium L.Bolus, accepted as Conophytum loeschianum Tischer, present
 Conophytum intrepidum L.Bolus, accepted as Conophytum bolusiae Schwantes subsp. bolusiae, present
 Conophytum irmae S.A.Hammer & Barnhill, endemic
 Conophytum jacobsenianum Tischer, accepted as Conophytum jucundum (N.E.Br.) N.E.Br. subsp. jucundum, present
 Conophytum jarmilae Halda, endemic
 Conophytum johannis-winkleri (Dinter & Schwantes) N.E.Br. accepted as Conophytum pageae (N.E.Br.) N.E.Br. present
 Conophytum joubertii Lavis, endemic
 Conophytum jucundum (N.E.Br.) N.E.Br. indigenous
 Conophytum jucundum (N.E.Br.) N.E.Br. subsp. fragile (Tischer) S.A.Hammer, endemic
 Conophytum jucundum (N.E.Br.) N.E.Br. subsp. jucundum, indigenous
 Conophytum jucundum (N.E.Br.) N.E.Br. subsp. marlothii (N.E.Br.) S.A.Hammer, endemic
 Conophytum jucundum (N.E.Br.) N.E.Br. subsp. ruschii (Schwantes) S.A.Hammer, endemic
 Conophytum julii]] Schwantes ex H.Jacobsen, accepted as Conophytum uviforme (Haw.) N.E.Br. subsp. uviforme, present
 Conophytum kennedyi L.Bolus, accepted as Conophytum lithopsoides L.Bolus subsp. lithopsoides, present
 Conophytum khamiesbergense (L.Bolus) Schwantes, endemic
 Conophytum klaverense N.E.Br. accepted as Conophytum obcordellum (Haw.) N.E.Br. subsp. obcordellum var. obcordellum, present
 Conophytum klipbokbergense L.Bolus, accepted as Conophytum bilobum (Marloth) N.E.Br. subsp. bilobum var. bilobum, present
 Conophytum komkansicum L.Bolus, accepted as Conophytum calculus (A.Berger) N.E.Br. subsp. calculus, present
 Conophytum koubergense L.Bolus, accepted as Conophytum lithopsoides L.Bolus subsp. koubergense (L.Bolus) S.A.Hammer, present
 Conophytum kubusanum N.E.Br. endemic
 Conophytum labiatum Tischer, accepted as Conophytum pageae (N.E.Br.) N.E.Br. present
 Conophytum labyrintheum (N.E.Br.) N.E.Br. accepted as Conophytum minimum (Haw.) N.E.Br. present
 Conophytum lacteum L.Bolus, accepted as Conophytum bilobum (Marloth) N.E.Br. subsp. bilobum var. bilobum, present
 Conophytum laetum L.Bolus, accepted as Conophytum meyeri N.E.Br. present
 Conophytum laetum L.Bolus var. extractum (Tischer) Rawe, accepted as Conophytum meyeri N.E.Br. present
 Conophytum lambertense Schick & Tischer, accepted as Conophytum obcordellum (Haw.) N.E.Br. present
 Conophytum lambertense Schick & Tischer var. conspicuum Rawe, accepted as Conophytum obcordellum (Haw.) N.E.Br. subsp. obcordellum var. obcordellum, present
 Conophytum lambertense Schick & Tischer var. rolfii (de Boer) Rawe, accepted as Conophytum obcordellum (Haw.) N.E.Br. subsp. rolfii (de Boer) S.A.Hammer, present
 Conophytum largum L.Bolus, accepted as Conophytum bilobum (Marloth) N.E.Br. subsp. bilobum var. bilobum, present
 Conophytum latum L.Bolus, accepted as Conophytum bilobum (Marloth) N.E.Br. subsp. bilobum var. bilobum, present
 Conophytum lavisianum L.Bolus, accepted as Conophytum bilobum (Marloth) N.E.Br. subsp. bilobum var. bilobum, present
 Conophytum lavranosii Rawe, accepted as Conophytum taylorianum (Dinter & Schwantes) N.E.Br. subsp. taylorianum, present
 Conophytum lavranosii Rawe var. cuneatum Rawe, accepted as Conophytum taylorianum (Dinter & Schwantes) N.E.Br. subsp. taylorianum, present
 Conophytum laxipetalum N.E.Br. accepted as Conophytum bilobum (Marloth) N.E.Br. subsp. bilobum var. bilobum, present
 Conophytum leightoniae L.Bolus, accepted as Conophytum piluliforme (N.E.Br.) N.E.Br. subsp. piluliforme, present
 Conophytum leipoldtii N.E.Br. accepted as Conophytum minusculum (N.E.Br.) N.E.Br. subsp. leipoldtii (N.E.Br.) S.A.Hammer, present
 Conophytum lekkersingense L.Bolus, accepted as Conophytum bilobum (Marloth) N.E.Br. subsp. bilobum var. bilobum, present
 Conophytum leopardinum L.Bolus, accepted as Conophytum meyeri N.E.Br. present
 Conophytum leptanthum L.Bolus, accepted as Conophytum jucundum (N.E.Br.) N.E.Br. subsp. marlothii (N.E.Br.) S.A.Hammer, present
 Conophytum leucanthum Lavis, accepted as Conophytum bilobum (Marloth) N.E.Br. subsp. bilobum var. bilobum, present
 Conophytum leucanthum Lavis var. multipetalum L.Bolus, accepted as Conophytum bilobum (Marloth) N.E.Br. subsp. bilobum var. bilobum, present
 Conophytum leviculum (N.E.Br.) N.E.Br. accepted as Conophytum minimum (Haw.) N.E.Br. present
 Conophytum lilianum Littlew. accepted as Conophytum pellucidum Schwantes subsp. pellucidum var. lilianum, present
 Conophytum limbatum N.E.Br. accepted as Conophytum ectypum N.E.Br. subsp. ectypum, present
 Conophytum limpidum S.A.Hammer, endemic
 Conophytum lindenianum Lavis & S.A.Hammer, accepted as Conophytum tantillum N.E.Br. subsp. lindenianum (Lavis & S.A.Hammer) S.A.Hammer, present
 Conophytum linearilucidum L.Bolus, accepted as Conophytum bilobum (Marloth) N.E.Br. subsp. bilobum var. linearilucidum, present
 Conophytum lithopsoides L.Bolus, indigenous
 Conophytum lithopsoides L.Bolus subsp. arturolfago S.A.Hammer, accepted as Conophytum arthurolfago S.A.Hammer, present
 Conophytum lithopsoides L.Bolus subsp. boreale (L.Bolus) S.A.Hammer, endemic
 Conophytum lithopsoides L.Bolus subsp. koubergense (L.Bolus) S.A.Hammer, endemic
 Conophytum lithopsoides L.Bolus subsp. lithopsoides, endemic
 Conophytum loeschianum Tischer, indigenous
 Conophytum longibracteatum L.Bolus, endemic
 Conophytum longistylum N.E.Br. accepted as Conophytum jucundum (N.E.Br.) N.E.Br. subsp. jucundum, present
 Conophytum longitubum L.Bolus, accepted as Conophytum truncatum (Thunb.) N.E.Br. subsp. viridicatum (N.E.Br.) S.A.Hammer, present
 Conophytum longum N.E.Br. endemic
 Conophytum lucipunctum N.E.Br. accepted as Conophytum subfenestratum Schwantes, present
 Conophytum luckhoffii Lavis, endemic
 Conophytum luisae Schwantes, accepted as Conophytum bilobum (Marloth) N.E.Br. subsp. altum (L.Bolus) S.A.Hammer, present
 Conophytum luisae Schwantes var. papillatum L.Bolus, accepted as Conophytum bilobum (Marloth) N.E.Br. subsp. altum (L.Bolus) S.A.Hammer, present
 Conophytum luteolum L.Bolus, accepted as Conophytum flavum N.E.Br. subsp. novicium (N.E.Br.) S.A.Hammer, present
 Conophytum luteolum L.Bolus var. macrostigma L.Bolus, accepted as Conophytum flavum N.E.Br. subsp. novicium (N.E.Br.) S.A.Hammer, present
 Conophytum lydiae (H.Jacobsen) G.D.Rowley, endemic
 Conophytum marginatum Lavis, indigenous
 Conophytum marginatum Lavis subsp. haramoepense (L.Bolus) S.A.Hammer, endemic
 Conophytum marginatum Lavis subsp. littlewoodii (L.Bolus) S.A.Hammer, indigenous
 Conophytum marginatum Lavis subsp. marginatum, endemic
 Conophytum marginatum Lavis var. eenkokerense (L.Bolus) Rawe, accepted as Conophytum tantillum N.E.Br. subsp. eenkokerense (L.Bolus) S.A.Hammer, present
 Conophytum marginatum Lavis var. haramoepense (L.Bolus) Rawe, accepted as Conophytum marginatum Lavis subsp. haramoepense (L.Bolus) S.A.Hammer, present
 Conophytum marginatum Lavis var. littlewoodii (L.Bolus) Rawe, accepted as Conophytum marginatum Lavis subsp. littlewoodii (L.Bolus) S.A.Hammer, present
 Conophytum markoetterae Schwantes, accepted as Conophytum bilobum (Marloth) N.E.Br. subsp. bilobum var. bilobum, present
 Conophytum marlothii N.E.Br. accepted as Conophytum jucundum (N.E.Br.) N.E.Br. subsp. marlothii (N.E.Br.) S.A.Hammer, present
 Conophytum marnierianum Tischer & Jacobsen, accepted as Conophytum hybrid, present
 Conophytum maughanii N.E.Br. indigenous
 Conophytum maughanii N.E.Br. subsp. armeniacum S.A.Hammer, endemic
 Conophytum maughanii N.E.Br. subsp. latum (Tischer) S.A.Hammer, endemic
 Conophytum maughanii N.E.Br. subsp. maughanii, indigenous
 Conophytum maximum Tischer, accepted as Conophytum jucundum (N.E.Br.) N.E.Br. subsp. jucundum, present
 Conophytum meridianum L.Bolus, accepted as Conophytum pellucidum Schwantes subsp. cupreatum (Tischer) S.A.Hammer var. cupreatum, present
 Conophytum meridianum L.Bolus var. pulverulentum L.Bolus, accepted as Conophytum pellucidum Schwantes subsp. cupreatum (Tischer) S.A.Hammer var. cupreatum, present
 Conophytum meyerae Schwantes, accepted as Conophytum bilobum (Marloth) N.E.Br. subsp. bilobum var. bilobum, present
 Conophytum meyerae Schwantes forma alatum Tischer, accepted as Conophytum bilobum (Marloth) N.E.Br. subsp. bilobum var. bilobum, present
 Conophytum meyerae Schwantes forma apiculatum (N.E.Br.) Tischer, accepted as Conophytum bilobum (Marloth) N.E.Br. subsp. bilobum var. bilobum, present
 Conophytum meyerae Schwantes forma asperulum (L.Bolus) H.Jacobsen, accepted as Conophytum bilobum (Marloth) N.E.Br. subsp. bilobum var. bilobum, present
 Conophytum meyerae Schwantes forma pole-evansii (N.E.Br.) Tischer, accepted as Conophytum bilobum (Marloth) N.E.Br. subsp. bilobum var. bilobum, present
 Conophytum meyeri N.E.Br. endemic
 Conophytum meyeri N.E.Br. var. globuliforme (Schick & Tischer) Rawe, accepted as Conophytum meyeri N.E.Br. present
 Conophytum meyeri N.E.Br. var. meyeri forma semilunulum, accepted as Conophytum meyeri N.E.Br. present
 Conophytum meyeri N.E.Br. var. quinarium L.Bolus, accepted as Conophytum meyeri N.E.Br. present
 Conophytum meyeri N.E.Br. var. ramosum (Lavis) Rawe, accepted as Conophytum meyeri N.E.Br. present
 Conophytum microstoma L.Bolus, accepted as Conophytum meyeri N.E.Br. present
 Conophytum middlemostii L.Bolus, accepted as Conophytum jucundum (N.E.Br.) N.E.Br. subsp. fragile (Tischer) S.A.Hammer, present
 Conophytum minimum (Haw.) N.E.Br. endemic
 Conophytum minusculum (N.E.Br.) N.E.Br. indigenous
 Conophytum minusculum (N.E.Br.) N.E.Br. subsp. aestiflorens S.A.Hammer & Smale, endemic
 Conophytum minusculum (N.E.Br.) N.E.Br. subsp. leipoldtii (N.E.Br.) S.A.Hammer, endemic
 Conophytum minusculum (N.E.Br.) N.E.Br. subsp. minusculum, endemic
 Conophytum minusculum (N.E.Br.) N.E.Br. var. paucilineatum Rawe, accepted as Conophytum minusculum (N.E.Br.) N.E.Br. subsp. minusculum, present
 Conophytum minusculum (N.E.Br.) N.E.Br. var. reticulatum (L.Bolus) Rawe ex G.D.Rowley forma reticula, accepted as Conophytum minusculum (N.E.Br.) N.E.Br. subsp. minusculum, present
 Conophytum minusculum (N.E.Br.) N.E.Br. var. reticulatum (L.Bolus) Rawe ex G.D.Rowley forma roseum, accepted as Conophytum minusculum (N.E.Br.) N.E.Br. subsp. minusculum, present
 Conophytum minusculum (N.E.Br.) N.E.Br. var. roseum (G.D.Rowley) Tischer, accepted as Conophytum minusculum (N.E.Br.) N.E.Br. subsp. minusculum, present
 Conophytum minutiflorum (Schwantes) N.E.Br. accepted as Conophytum pageae (N.E.Br.) N.E.Br. present
 Conophytum minutum (Haw.) N.E.Br. indigenous
 Conophytum minutum (Haw.) N.E.Br. forma sellatum (Tischer) Rawe, accepted as Conophytum minutum (Haw.) N.E.Br. var. minutum, present
 Conophytum minutum (Haw.) N.E.Br. var. laxum Lavis, accepted as Conophytum minutum (Haw.) N.E.Br. var. minutum, present
 Conophytum minutum (Haw.) N.E.Br. var. minutum, endemic
 Conophytum minutum (Haw.) N.E.Br. var. nudum (Tischer) Boom, endemic
 Conophytum minutum (Haw.) N.E.Br. var. pearsonii (N.E.Br.) Boom, endemic
 Conophytum minutum (Haw.) N.E.Br. var. sellatum (Tischer) Boom, accepted as Conophytum minutum (Haw.) N.E.Br. var. minutum, present
 Conophytum mirabile A.R.Mitch. & S.A.Hammer, endemic
 Conophytum misellum N.E.Br. accepted as Conophytum saxetanum (N.E.Br.) N.E.Br. present
 Conophytum miserum N.E.Br. accepted as Conophytum hians N.E.Br. present
 Conophytum modestum L.Bolus, accepted as Conophytum quaesitum (N.E.Br.) N.E.Br. subsp. quaesitum var. quaesitum, present
 Conophytum muirii N.E.Br. accepted as Conophytum truncatum (Thunb.) N.E.Br. subsp. viridicatum (N.E.Br.) S.A.Hammer, present
 Conophytum multicolor Tischer, accepted as Conophytum obcordellum (Haw.) N.E.Br. subsp. obcordellum var. obcordellum, present
 Conophytum muscosipapillatum Lavis, accepted as Conophytum bilobum (Marloth) N.E.Br. subsp. bilobum var. muscosipapillatum, present
 Conophytum namibense N.E.Br. accepted as Conophytum saxetanum (N.E.Br.) N.E.Br. present
 Conophytum namiesicum L.Bolus, accepted as Conophytum calculus (A.Berger) N.E.Br. subsp. vanzylii (Lavis) S.A.Hammer, present
 Conophytum nanum Tischer, accepted as Conophytum meyeri N.E.Br. present
 Conophytum nelianum Schwantes, accepted as Conophytum bilobum (Marloth) N.E.Br. subsp. bilobum var. bilobum, present
 Conophytum nevillei (N.E.Br.) N.E.Br. accepted as Conophytum obcordellum (Haw.) N.E.Br. subsp. obcordellum var. obcordellum, present
 Conophytum noisabiense L.Bolus, accepted as Conophytum bilobum (Marloth) N.E.Br. subsp. bilobum var. bilobum, present
 Conophytum nordenstamii L.Bolus, accepted as Conophytum jucundum (N.E.Br.) N.E.Br. subsp. fragile (Tischer) S.A.Hammer, present
 Conophytum notabile N.E.Br. accepted as Conophytum frutescens Schwantes, present
 Conophytum notatum N.E.Br. accepted as Conophytum minimum (Haw.) N.E.Br. present
 Conophytum novellum N.E.Br. accepted as Conophytum truncatum (Thunb.) N.E.Br. subsp. viridicatum (N.E.Br.) S.A.Hammer, present
 Conophytum novicium N.E.Br. accepted as Conophytum flavum N.E.Br. subsp. novicium (N.E.Br.) S.A.Hammer, present
 Conophytum nutaboiense Tischer, accepted as Conophytum bilobum (Marloth) N.E.Br. subsp. bilobum var. bilobum, present
 Conophytum obconellum (Haw.) Schwantes, accepted as Conophytum obcordellum (Haw.) N.E.Br. subsp. obcordellum var. obcordellum, present
 Conophytum obcordellum (Haw.) N.E.Br. indigenous
 Conophytum obcordellum (Haw.) N.E.Br. subsp. obcordellum var. ceresianum, endemic
 Conophytum obcordellum (Haw.) N.E.Br. subsp. obcordellum var. obcordellum, endemic
 Conophytum obcordellum (Haw.) N.E.Br. subsp. rolfii (de Boer) S.A.Hammer, endemic
 Conophytum obcordellum (Haw.) N.E.Br. subsp. stenandrum (L.Bolus) S.A.Hammer, endemic
 Conophytum obcordellum (Haw.) N.E.Br. var. germanum (N.E.Br.) Rawe, accepted as Conophytum obcordellum (Haw.) N.E.Br. subsp. obcordellum var. obcordellum, present
 Conophytum obcordellum (Haw.) N.E.Br. var. mundum (N.E.Br.) Rawe forma mundum, accepted as Conophytum obcordellum (Haw.) N.E.Br. subsp. obcordellum var. obcordellum, present
 Conophytum obcordellum (Haw.) N.E.Br. var. mundum (N.E.Br.) Rawe forma picturatum, accepted as Conophytum obcordellum (Haw.) N.E.Br. subsp. obcordellum var. obcordellum, present
 Conophytum obcordellum (Haw.) N.E.Br. var. mundum (N.E.Br.) Rawe forma stayneri, accepted as Conophytum obcordellum (Haw.) N.E.Br. subsp. obcordellum var. ceresianum, present
 Conophytum obcordellum (Haw.) N.E.Br. var. mundum (N.E.Br.) Rawe forma ursprungianum, accepted as Conophytum obcordellum (Haw.) N.E.Br. subsp. obcordellum var. obcordellum, present
 Conophytum obmetale (N.E.Br.) N.E.Br. accepted as Conophytum minimum (Haw.) N.E.Br. present
 Conophytum obovatum Lavis, accepted as Conophytum globosum (N.E.Br.) N.E.Br. present
 Conophytum obovatum Lavis var. obtusum L.Bolus, accepted as Conophytum globosum (N.E.Br.) N.E.Br. present
 Conophytum obscurum N.E.Br. indigenous
 Conophytum obscurum N.E.Br. subsp. barbatum (L.Bolus) S.A.Hammer, endemic
 Conophytum obscurum N.E.Br. subsp. obscurum, endemic
 Conophytum obscurum N.E.Br. subsp. sponsaliorum (S.A.Hammer) S.A.Hammer, endemic
 Conophytum obscurum N.E.Br. subsp. vitreopapillum (Rawe) S.A.Hammer, endemic
 Conophytum obtusum N.E.Br. accepted as Conophytum bilobum (Marloth) N.E.Br. subsp. bilobum var. bilobum, present
 Conophytum obtusum N.E.Br. var. amplum (L.Bolus) Rawe, accepted as Conophytum bilobum (Marloth) N.E.Br. subsp. bilobum var. bilobum, present
 Conophytum orbicum N.E.Br. ex Tischer, accepted as Conophytum jucundum (N.E.Br.) N.E.Br. subsp. jucundum, present
 Conophytum orientale L.Bolus, accepted as Conophytum truncatum (Thunb.) N.E.Br. subsp. truncatum var. truncatum, present
 Conophytum ornatum Lavis, accepted as Conophytum flavum N.E.Br. subsp. flavum, present
 Conophytum ovatum L.Bolus, accepted as Conophytum bilobum (Marloth) N.E.Br. subsp. bilobum var. bilobum, present
 Conophytum ovigerum Schwantes, accepted as Conophytum meyeri N.E.Br. present
 Conophytum pageae (N.E.Br.) N.E.Br. indigenous
 Conophytum pageae (N.E.Br.) N.E.Br. var. albiflorum Rawe, accepted as Conophytum pageae (N.E.Br.) N.E.Br. present
 Conophytum pageae (N.E.Br.) N.E.Br. var. pygmaeum (Schick & Tischer) Rawe, accepted as Conophytum stevens-jonesianum L.Bolus, present
 Conophytum pallidum (N.E.Br.) N.E.Br. accepted as Conophytum ficiforme (Haw.) N.E.Br. present
 Conophytum pardicolor Tischer, accepted as Conophytum pellucidum Schwantes subsp. pellucidum var. pellucidum, present
 Conophytum pardivisum Tischer, accepted as Conophytum uviforme (Haw.) N.E.Br. subsp. uviforme, present
 Conophytum parviflorum N.E.Br. accepted as Conophytum obcordellum (Haw.) N.E.Br. subsp. obcordellum var. obcordellum, present
 Conophytum parvulum L.Bolus, accepted as Conophytum bilobum (Marloth) N.E.Br. subsp. bilobum var. bilobum, present
 Conophytum paucipunctum Tischer, accepted as Conophytum breve N.E.Br. present
 Conophytum pauperae L.Bolus, accepted as Conophytum pageae (N.E.Br.) N.E.Br. present
 Conophytum pauxillum (N.E.Br.) N.E.Br. accepted as Conophytum minimum (Haw.) N.E.Br. present
 Conophytum pearsonii N.E.Br. accepted as Conophytum minutum (Haw.) N.E.Br. var. pearsonii (N.E.Br.) Boom
 Conophytum pearsonii N.E.Br. var. latisectum L.Bolus, accepted as Conophytum minutum (Haw.) N.E.Br. var. pearsonii (N.E.Br.) Boom, present
 Conophytum pearsonii N.E.Br. var. minor N.E.Br. accepted as Conophytum minutum (Haw.) N.E.Br. var. pearsonii (N.E.Br.) Boom, present
 Conophytum peersii Lavis, accepted as Conophytum truncatum (Thunb.) N.E.Br. subsp. truncatum var. truncatum, present
 Conophytum peersii Lavis var. multipunctatum (Tischer) Rawe, accepted as Conophytum truncatum (Thunb.) N.E.Br. subsp. truncatum var. truncatum, present
 Conophytum pellucidum Schwantes, indigenous
 Conophytum pellucidum Schwantes subsp. cupreatum (Tischer) S.A.Hammer var. cupreatum, endemic
 Conophytum pellucidum Schwantes subsp. cupreatum (Tischer) S.A.Hammer var. terrestre, endemic
 Conophytum pellucidum Schwantes subsp. pellucidum var. lilianum, endemic
 Conophytum pellucidum Schwantes subsp. pellucidum var. neohallii, endemic
 Conophytum pellucidum Schwantes subsp. pellucidum var. pellucidum, endemic
 Conophytum pellucidum Schwantes subsp. pellucidum var. terricolor, endemic
 Conophytum pellucidum Schwantes subsp. saueri S.A.Hammer & Smale, endemic
 Conophytum percrassum Schick & Tischer, accepted as Conophytum flavum N.E.Br. subsp. flavum, present
 Conophytum permaculatum Tischer, accepted as Conophytum truncatum (Thunb.) N.E.Br. subsp. truncatum var. wiggettiae, present
 Conophytum petraeum N.E.Br. accepted as Conophytum minimum (Haw.) N.E.Br. present
 Conophytum phoenicium S.A.Hammer, endemic
 Conophytum pictum (N.E.Br.) N.E.Br. accepted as Conophytum minimum (Haw.) N.E.Br. present
 Conophytum picturatum N.E.Br. accepted as Conophytum obcordellum (Haw.) N.E.Br. subsp. obcordellum var. obcordellum, present
 Conophytum pillansii Lavis, accepted as Conophytum subfenestratum Schwantes, present
 Conophytum piluliforme (N.E.Br.) N.E.Br. indigenous
 Conophytum piluliforme (N.E.Br.) N.E.Br. subsp. edwardii (Schwantes) S.A.Hammer, endemic
 Conophytum piluliforme (N.E.Br.) N.E.Br. subsp. piluliforme, endemic
 Conophytum piluliforme (N.E.Br.) N.E.Br. var. advenum (N.E.Br.) Rawe, accepted as Conophytum piluliforme (N.E.Br.) N.E.Br. subsp. piluliforme, present
 Conophytum piluliforme (N.E.Br.) N.E.Br. var. brevipetalum (Lavis) Rawe, accepted as Conophytum piluliforme (N.E.Br.) N.E.Br. subsp. piluliforme, present
 Conophytum piriforme L.Bolus, accepted as Conophytum bilobum (Marloth) N.E.Br. subsp. bilobum var. bilobum, present
 Conophytum pium S.A.Hammer, indigenous
 Conophytum placitum (N.E.Br.) N.E.Br. accepted as Conophytum ficiforme (Haw.) N.E.Br. present
 Conophytum placitum (N.E.Br.) N.E.Br. var. pubescens Littlew. accepted as Conophytum ficiforme (Haw.) N.E.Br. present
 Conophytum plenum N.E.Br. accepted as Conophytum bilobum (Marloth) N.E.Br. subsp. bilobum var. bilobum, present
 Conophytum pluriforme L.Bolus, accepted as Conophytum bilobum (Marloth) N.E.Br. subsp. bilobum var. bilobum, present
 Conophytum poellnitzianum Schwantes, accepted as Conophytum pageae (N.E.Br.) N.E.Br. present
 Conophytum pole-evansii N.E.Br. accepted as Conophytum bilobum (Marloth) N.E.Br. subsp. bilobum var. bilobum, present
 Conophytum polulum N.E.Br. accepted as Conophytum minimum (Haw.) N.E.Br. present
 Conophytum polyandrum Lavis, accepted as Conophytum velutinum Schwantes subsp. polyandrum (Lavis) S.A.Hammer, present
 Conophytum praecinctum N.E.Br. accepted as Conophytum minimum (Haw.) N.E.Br. present
 Conophytum praecox N.E.Br. accepted as Conophytum fraternum (N.E.Br.) N.E.Br. present
 Conophytum praegratum Tischer, accepted as Conophytum jucundum (N.E.Br.) N.E.Br. subsp. jucundum, present
 Conophytum praeparvum N.E.Br. accepted as Conophytum uviforme (Haw.) N.E.Br. subsp. uviforme, present
 Conophytum praeparvum N.E.Br. var. roseum Lavis, accepted as Conophytum uviforme (Haw.) N.E.Br. subsp. uviforme, present
 Conophytum praesectum N.E.Br. endemic
 Conophytum prolongatum L.Bolus, accepted as Conophytum uviforme (Haw.) N.E.Br. subsp. uviforme, present
 Conophytum proximum L.Bolus, accepted as Conophytum bilobum (Marloth) N.E.Br. subsp. bilobum var. bilobum, present
 Conophytum puberulum Lavis, accepted as Conophytum meyeri N.E.Br. present
 Conophytum pubescens (Tischer) G.D.Rowley, endemic
 Conophytum pubicalyx Lavis, endemic
 Conophytum pulchellum Tischer, accepted as Conophytum obscurum N.E.Br. subsp. obscurum, present
 Conophytum pumilum N.E.Br. accepted as Conophytum breve N.E.Br. present
 Conophytum purpusii (Schwantes) N.E.Br. accepted as Conophytum truncatum (Thunb.) N.E.Br. subsp. truncatum var. truncatum, present
 Conophytum pusillum (N.E.Br.) N.E.Br. accepted as Conophytum minimum (Haw.) N.E.Br. present
 Conophytum pygmaeum Schick & Tischer, accepted as Conophytum breve N.E.Br. present
 Conophytum quaesitum (N.E.Br.) N.E.Br. indigenous
 Conophytum quaesitum (N.E.Br.) N.E.Br. subsp. quaesitum var. quaesitum, indigenous
 Conophytum quaesitum (N.E.Br.) N.E.Br. subsp. quaesitum var. rostratum, endemic
 Conophytum quartziticum Tischer, accepted as Conophytum quaesitum (N.E.Br.) N.E.Br. subsp. quaesitum var. quaesitum, present
 Conophytum radiatum Tischer, accepted as Conophytum minimum (Haw.) N.E.Br. present
 Conophytum rarum N.E.Br. accepted as Conophytum jucundum (N.E.Br.) N.E.Br. subsp. jucundum, present
 Conophytum ratum S.A.Hammer, endemic
 Conophytum rauhii Tischer, accepted as Conophytum uviforme (Haw.) N.E.Br. subsp. rauhii (Tischer) S.A.Hammer, present
 Conophytum rawei G.D.Rowley, accepted as Conophytum longum N.E.Br. present
 Conophytum recisum N.E.Br. accepted as Conophytum bilobum (Marloth) N.E.Br. subsp. bilobum var. bilobum, present
 Conophytum reconditum A.R.Mitch. indigenous
 Conophytum reconditum A.R.Mitch. subsp. buysianum (A.R.Mitch. & S.A.Hammer) S.A.Hammer, endemic
 Conophytum reconditum A.R.Mitch. subsp. reconditum, endemic
 Conophytum regale Lavis, endemic
 Conophytum renniei Lavis, accepted as Conophytum truncatum (Thunb.) N.E.Br. subsp. truncatum var. truncatum, present
 Conophytum renominatum G.D.Rowley, accepted as Conophytum friedrichiae (Dinter) Schwantes, present
 Conophytum retusum N.E.Br. accepted as Conophytum meyeri N.E.Br. present
 Conophytum robustum Tischer, accepted as Conophytum jucundum (N.E.Br.) N.E.Br. subsp. jucundum, present
 Conophytum roodiae N.E.Br. indigenous
 Conophytum roodiae N.E.Br. subsp. corrugatum Smale, endemic
 Conophytum roodiae N.E.Br. subsp. cylindratum (Schwantes) Smale, endemic
 Conophytum roodiae N.E.Br. subsp. roodiae, endemic
 Conophytum roodiae N.E.Br. subsp. sanguineum (S.A.Hammer) Smale, endemic
 Conophytum rooipanense L.Bolus, accepted as Conophytum uviforme (Haw.) N.E.Br. subsp. uviforme, present
 Conophytum rostratum Tischer, accepted as Conophytum quaesitum (N.E.Br.) N.E.Br. subsp. quaesitum var. rostratum, present
 Conophytum rubricarinatum Tischer, accepted as Conophytum loeschianum Tischer, present
 Conophytum rubristylosum Tischer, accepted as Conophytum flavum N.E.Br. subsp. novicium (N.E.Br.) S.A.Hammer, present
 Conophytum rubrolineatum Rawe, accepted as Conophytum swanepoelianum Rawe subsp. rubrolineatum (Rawe) S.A.Hammer, present
 Conophytum rubroniveum L.Bolus, accepted as Conophytum roodiae N.E.Br. subsp. roodiae, present
 Conophytum rubrum L.Bolus, accepted as Conophytum piluliforme (N.E.Br.) N.E.Br. subsp. edwardii (Schwantes) S.A.Hammer, present
 Conophytum rufescens N.E.Br. accepted as Conophytum maughanii N.E.Br. subsp. maughanii, present
 Conophytum rugosum S.A.Hammer, endemic
 Conophytum rugosum S.A.Hammer subsp. sanguineum S.A.Hammer, accepted as Conophytum roodiae N.E.Br. subsp. sanguineum (S.A.Hammer) Smale, present
 Conophytum ruschii Schwantes, accepted as Conophytum jucundum (N.E.Br.) N.E.Br. subsp. ruschii (Schwantes) S.A.Hammer, present
 Conophytum ruschii Schwantes var. obtusipetalum L.Bolus, accepted as Conophytum jucundum (N.E.Br.) N.E.Br. subsp. ruschii (Schwantes) S.A.Hammer, present
 Conophytum salmonicolor L.Bolus, accepted as Conophytum frutescens Schwantes, present
 Conophytum saxetanum (N.E.Br.) N.E.Br. indigenous
 Conophytum saxetanum (N.E.Br.) N.E.Br. forma hallianum G.D.Rowley, accepted as Conophytum saxetanum (N.E.Br.) N.E.Br. present
 Conophytum saxetanum (N.E.Br.) N.E.Br. var. loeschianum (Tischer) Rawe, accepted as Conophytum loeschianum Tischer, present
 Conophytum saxetanum (N.E.Br.) N.E.Br. var. misellum (N.E.Br.) Rawe, accepted as Conophytum saxetanum (N.E.Br.) N.E.Br. present
 Conophytum schickianum Tischer, accepted as Conophytum pageae (N.E.Br.) N.E.Br. present
 Conophytum schlechteri Schwantes, endemic
 Conophytum schwantesii G.D.Rowley, accepted as Conophytum friedrichiae (Dinter) Schwantes, present
 Conophytum scitulum (N.E.Br.) N.E.Br. accepted as Conophytum minimum (Haw.) N.E.Br. present
 Conophytum semivestitum L.Bolus, endemic
 Conophytum senarium L.Bolus, accepted as Conophytum marginatum Lavis subsp. haramoepense (L.Bolus) S.A.Hammer, present
 Conophytum signatum (N.E.Br.) N.E.Br. accepted as Conophytum minimum (Haw.) N.E.Br. present
 Conophytum simile N.E.Br. accepted as Conophytum bilobum (Marloth) N.E.Br. subsp. bilobum var. bilobum, present
 Conophytum simplum N.E.Br. accepted as Conophytum bilobum (Marloth) N.E.Br. subsp. bilobum var. bilobum, present
 Conophytum singulare G.D.Rowley, accepted as Conophytum caroli Lavis, present
 Conophytum sitzlerianum Schwantes, accepted as Conophytum bilobum (Marloth) N.E.Br. subsp. bilobum var. bilobum, present
 Conophytum smithersii L.Bolus, accepted as Conophytum bilobum (Marloth) N.E.Br. subsp. bilobum var. bilobum, present
 Conophytum smorenskaduense de Boer, endemic
 Conophytum smorenskaduense de Boer subsp. hermarium S.A.Hammer, accepted as Conophytum hermarium (S.A.Hammer) S.A.Hammer, present
 Conophytum sororium N.E.Br. accepted as Conophytum bilobum (Marloth) N.E.Br. subsp. bilobum var. bilobum, present
 Conophytum speciosum Tischer, accepted as Conophytum jucundum (N.E.Br.) N.E.Br. subsp. ruschii (Schwantes) S.A.Hammer, present
 Conophytum spectabile Lavis, accepted as Conophytum obcordellum (Haw.) N.E.Br. subsp. obcordellum var. obcordellum, present
 Conophytum spirale N.E.Br. accepted as Conophytum truncatum (Thunb.) N.E.Br. subsp. truncatum var. truncatum, present
 Conophytum springbokense N.E.Br. accepted as Conophytum bilobum (Marloth) N.E.Br. subsp. bilobum var. bilobum, present
 Conophytum stenandrum L.Bolus, accepted as Conophytum obcordellum (Haw.) N.E.Br. subsp. stenandrum (L.Bolus) S.A.Hammer, present
 Conophytum stephanii Schwantes, indigenous
 Conophytum stephanii Schwantes subsp. abductum S.A.Hammer, accepted as Conophytum stephanii Schwantes subsp. stephanii, present
 Conophytum stephanii Schwantes subsp. helmutii (Lavis) S.A.Hammer, endemic
 Conophytum stephanii Schwantes subsp. stephanii, endemic
 Conophytum stevens-jonesianum L.Bolus, endemic
 Conophytum stipitatum L.Bolus, accepted as Conophytum uviforme (Haw.) N.E.Br. subsp. uviforme, present
 Conophytum strictum L.Bolus, accepted as Conophytum bilobum (Marloth) N.E.Br. subsp. bilobum var. bilobum, present
 Conophytum strictum L.Bolus var. inaequale L.Bolus, accepted as Conophytum bilobum (Marloth) N.E.Br. subsp. bilobum var. bilobum, present
 Conophytum stylosum (N.E.Br.) Tischer, accepted as Conophytum bilobum (Marloth) N.E.Br. subsp. bilobum var. bilobum, present
 Conophytum subacutum L.Bolus, accepted as Conophytum bilobum (Marloth) N.E.Br. subsp. bilobum var. bilobum, present
 Conophytum subconfusum Tischer, accepted as Conophytum piluliforme (N.E.Br.) N.E.Br. subsp. piluliforme, present
 Conophytum subcylindricum L.Bolus, accepted as Conophytum bilobum (Marloth) N.E.Br. subsp. bilobum var. bilobum, present
 Conophytum subfenestratum Schwantes, endemic
 Conophytum subrisum (N.E.Br.) N.E.Br. accepted as Conophytum pageae (N.E.Br.) N.E.Br. present
 Conophytum subtenue L.Bolus, accepted as Conophytum bilobum (Marloth) N.E.Br. subsp. bilobum var. bilobum, present
 Conophytum subterraneum Smale & T.Jacobs, endemic
 Conophytum subtile N.E.Br. accepted as Conophytum breve N.E.Br. present
 Conophytum sulcatum L.Bolus, accepted as Conophytum ectypum N.E.Br. subsp. sulcatum (L.Bolus) S.A.Hammer, present
 Conophytum supremum L.Bolus, accepted as Conophytum bilobum (Marloth) N.E.Br. subsp. bilobum var. bilobum, present
 Conophytum swanepoelianum Rawe, indigenous
 Conophytum swanepoelianum Rawe subsp. proliferans S.A.Hammer, endemic
 Conophytum swanepoelianum Rawe subsp. rubrolineatum (Rawe) S.A.Hammer, endemic
 Conophytum swanepoelianum Rawe subsp. swanepoelianum, endemic
 Conophytum tantillum N.E.Br. indigenous
 Conophytum tantillum N.E.Br. subsp. amicorum S.A.Hammer & Barnhill, endemic
 Conophytum tantillum N.E.Br. subsp. eenkokerense (L.Bolus) S.A.Hammer, endemic
 Conophytum tantillum N.E.Br. subsp. heleniae (Rawe) S.A.Hammer, endemic
 Conophytum tantillum N.E.Br. subsp. inexpectatum S.A.Hammer, endemic
 Conophytum tantillum N.E.Br. subsp. lindenianum (Lavis & S.A.Hammer) S.A.Hammer, endemic
 Conophytum tantillum N.E.Br. subsp. tantillum, endemic
 Conophytum taylorianum (Dinter & Schwantes) N.E.Br. indigenous
 Conophytum taylorianum (Dinter & Schwantes) N.E.Br. subsp. rosynense S.A.Hammer, endemic
 Conophytum tectum N.E.Br. accepted as Conophytum bilobum (Marloth) N.E.Br. subsp. bilobum var. bilobum, present
 Conophytum teguliflorum Tischer, accepted as Conophytum frutescens Schwantes, present
 Conophytum tenuisectum L.Bolus, accepted as Conophytum pageae (N.E.Br.) N.E.Br. present
 Conophytum terrestre Tischer, accepted as Conophytum pellucidum Schwantes subsp. cupreatum (Tischer) S.A.Hammer var. terrestre, present
 Conophytum terricolor Tischer, accepted as Conophytum pellucidum Schwantes subsp. pellucidum var. terricolor, present
 Conophytum tetracarpum Lavis, accepted as Conophytum flavum N.E.Br. subsp. flavum, present
 Conophytum thudichumi L.Bolus, accepted as Conophytum pageae (N.E.Br.) N.E.Br. present
 Conophytum tinctum Lavis, accepted as Conophytum flavum N.E.Br. subsp. flavum, present
 Conophytum tischleri Schwantes, accepted as Conophytum ectypum N.E.Br. subsp. ectypum, present
 Conophytum tomasi Halda, endemic
 Conophytum translucens N.E.Br. accepted as Conophytum truncatum (Thunb.) N.E.Br. subsp. truncatum var. truncatum, present
 Conophytum triebneri Schwantes, accepted as Conophytum marginatum Lavis subsp. haramoepense (L.Bolus) S.A.Hammer, present
 Conophytum truncatum (Thunb.) N.E.Br. indigenous
 Conophytum truncatum (Thunb.) N.E.Br. subsp. truncatum var. truncatum, endemic
 Conophytum truncatum (Thunb.) N.E.Br. subsp. truncatum var. wiggettiae, endemic
 Conophytum truncatum (Thunb.) N.E.Br. subsp. viridicatum (N.E.Br.) S.A.Hammer, endemic
 Conophytum truncatum (Thunb.) N.E.Br. var. brevitubum (Lavis) Tischer, accepted as Conophytum truncatum (Thunb.) N.E.Br. subsp. truncatum var. truncatum, present
 Conophytum truncatum (Thunb.) N.E.Br. var. truncatum forma  parvipunctum, accepted as Conophytum truncatum (Thunb.) N.E.Br. subsp. truncatum var. truncatum, present
 Conophytum tubatum Tischer, accepted as Conophytum minutum (Haw.) N.E.Br. var. pearsonii (N.E.Br.) Boom, present
 Conophytum tumidum N.E.Br. accepted as Conophytum bilobum (Marloth) N.E.Br. subsp. bilobum var. bilobum, present
 Conophytum tumidum N.E.Br. var. asperulum L.Bolus, accepted as Conophytum bilobum (Marloth) N.E.Br. subsp. bilobum var. bilobum, present
 Conophytum turbiniforme Rawe, accepted as Conophytum auriflorum Tischer subsp. turbiniforme (Rawe) S.A.Hammer, present
 Conophytum turrigerum (N.E.Br.) N.E.Br. endemic
 Conophytum udabibense Loesch & Tischer, accepted as Conophytum pageae (N.E.Br.) N.E.Br. present
 Conophytum umdausense L.Bolus, accepted as Conophytum bilobum (Marloth) N.E.Br. subsp. bilobum var. bilobum, present
 Conophytum uviforme (Haw.) N.E.Br. indigenous
 Conophytum uviforme (Haw.) N.E.Br. forma framesii (Lavis) Tischer, accepted as Conophytum uviforme (Haw.) N.E.Br. subsp. uviforme, present
 Conophytum uviforme (Haw.) N.E.Br. forma meleagris (L.Bolus) Tischer, accepted as Conophytum uviforme (Haw.) N.E.Br. subsp. uviforme, present
 Conophytum uviforme (Haw.) N.E.Br. subsp. decoratum (N.E.Br.) S.A.Hammer, endemic
 Conophytum uviforme (Haw.) N.E.Br. subsp. rauhii (Tischer) S.A.Hammer, endemic
 Conophytum uviforme (Haw.) N.E.Br. subsp. subincanum (Tischer) S.A.Hammer, endemic
 Conophytum uviforme (Haw.) N.E.Br. subsp. uviforme, endemic
 Conophytum uviforme (Haw.) N.E.Br. var. clarum (N.E.Br.) Rawe, accepted as Conophytum uviforme (Haw.) N.E.Br. subsp. uviforme, present
 Conophytum uviforme (Haw.) N.E.Br. var. litorale (L.Bolus) Rawe, accepted as Conophytum uviforme (Haw.) N.E.Br. subsp. uviforme, present
 Conophytum uviforme (Haw.) N.E.Br. var. occultum (L.Bolus) Rawe, accepted as Conophytum uviforme (Haw.) N.E.Br. subsp. uviforme, present
 Conophytum uviforme (Haw.) N.E.Br. var. subincanum (Tischer) Rawe, accepted as Conophytum uviforme (Haw.) N.E.Br. subsp. uviforme, present
 Conophytum vagum N.E.Br. accepted as Conophytum minimum (Haw.) N.E.Br. present
 Conophytum vanbredae L.Bolus, accepted as Conophytum globosum (N.E.Br.) N.E.Br. present
 Conophytum vanheerdei Tischer, endemic
 Conophytum vanrhynsdorpense Schwantes, accepted as Conophytum uviforme (Haw.) N.E.Br. subsp. uviforme, present
 Conophytum vanzylii Lavis, accepted as Conophytum calculus (A.Berger) N.E.Br. subsp. vanzylii (Lavis) S.A.Hammer, present
 Conophytum variabile L.Bolus, accepted as Conophytum bilobum (Marloth) N.E.Br. subsp. bilobum var. bilobum, present
 Conophytum varians L.Bolus, accepted as Conophytum uviforme (Haw.) N.E.Br. subsp. decoratum (N.E.Br.) S.A.Hammer, present
 Conophytum velutinum Schwantes, indigenous
 Conophytum velutinum Schwantes subsp. polyandrum (Lavis) S.A.Hammer, endemic
 Conophytum velutinum Schwantes subsp. velutinum, endemic
 Conophytum velutinum Schwantes var. craterulum (Tischer) Rawe, accepted as Conophytum velutinum Schwantes subsp. velutinum, present
 Conophytum verrucosum (Lavis) G.D.Rowley, endemic
 Conophytum vescum N.E.Br. accepted as Conophytum saxetanum (N.E.Br.) N.E.Br. present
 Conophytum violaciflorum Schick & Tischer, endemic
 Conophytum viride Tischer, accepted as Conophytum joubertii Lavis, present
 Conophytum viridicatum (N.E.Br.) N.E.Br. accepted as Conophytum truncatum (Thunb.) N.E.Br. subsp. viridicatum (N.E.Br.) S.A.Hammer, present
 Conophytum viridicatum (N.E.Br.) N.E.Br. var. pisinnum (N.E.Br.) Rawe, accepted as Conophytum truncatum (Thunb.) N.E.Br. subsp. viridicatum (N.E.Br.) S.A.Hammer, present
 Conophytum vitreopapillum Rawe, accepted as Conophytum obscurum N.E.Br. subsp. vitreopapillum (Rawe) S.A.Hammer, present
 Conophytum vlakmynense L.Bolus, accepted as Conophytum bilobum (Marloth) N.E.Br. subsp. bilobum var. bilobum, present
 Conophytum wettsteinii (A.Berger) N.E.Br. endemic
 Conophytum wettsteinii (A.Berger) N.E.Br. subsp. fragile (Tischer) S.A.Hammer, accepted as Conophytum jucundum (N.E.Br.) N.E.Br. subsp. fragile (Tischer) S.A.Hammer, present
 Conophytum wettsteinii (A.Berger) N.E.Br. subsp. francoiseae S.A.Hammer, accepted as Conophytum francoiseae (S.A.Hammer) S.A.Hammer, present
 Conophytum wettsteinii (A.Berger) N.E.Br. subsp. ruschii (Schwantes) S.A.Hammer, accepted as Conophytum jucundum (N.E.Br.) N.E.Br. subsp. ruschii (Schwantes) S.A.Hammer, present
 Conophytum wettsteinii (A.Berger) N.E.Br. var. oculatum L.Bolus, accepted as Conophytum jucundum (N.E.Br.) N.E.Br. subsp. ruschii (Schwantes) S.A.Hammer, present
 Conophytum wettsteinii (A.Berger) N.E.Br. var. speciosum (Tischer) Tischer, accepted as Conophytum jucundum (N.E.Br.) N.E.Br. subsp. ruschii (Schwantes) S.A.Hammer, present
 Conophytum wittebergense de Boer, accepted as Conophytum minimum (Haw.) N.E.Br. present

Corpuscularia 
Genus Corpuscularia:
 Corpuscularia angustifolia (L.Bolus) H.E.K.Hartmann, endemic
 Corpuscularia angustipetala (Lavis) H.E.K.Hartmann, endemic
 Corpuscularia appressa (L.Bolus) H.E.K.Hartmann, endemic
 Corpuscularia britteniae (L.Bolus) H.E.K.Hartmann, endemic
 Corpuscularia cymbiformis (Haw.) Schwantes, endemic
 Corpuscularia gracilis (L.Bolus) H.E.K.Hartmann, accepted as Corpuscularia gracillima (L.Bolus) Niederle, endemic
 Corpuscularia gracillima (L.Bolus) Niederle, endemic
 Corpuscularia lehmannii (Eckl. & Zeyh.) Schwantes, endemic
 Corpuscularia taylori (N.E.Br.) Schwantes, endemic

Cryophytum 
Genus Cryophytum:
 Cryophytum aitonis (Jacq.) N.E.Br. accepted as Mesembryanthemum aitonis Jacq. indigenous
 Cryophytum angulatum (Thunb.) Schwantes, accepted as Mesembryanthemum aitonis Jacq. indigenous
 Cryophytum barklyi (N.E.Br.) N.E.Br. ex L.Bolus, accepted as Mesembryanthemum barklyi N.E.Br. indigenous
 Cryophytum bijliae N.E.Br. accepted as Mesembryanthemum aitonis Jacq. indigenous
 Cryophytum burchellii N.E.Br. accepted as Mesembryanthemum aitonis Jacq. indigenous
 Cryophytum clandestinum (Haw.) L.Bolus, accepted as Mesembryanthemum clandestinum Haw. indigenous
 Cryophytum conjectum N.E.Br. accepted as Mesembryanthemum clandestinum Haw. indigenous
 Cryophytum crystallinum (L.) N.E.Br. accepted as Mesembryanthemum crystallinum L. indigenous
 Cryophytum gariusanum Dinter ex Range, accepted as Mesembryanthemum gariusanum Dinter, indigenous
 Cryophytum guerichianum (Pax) Schwantes, accepted as Mesembryanthemum guerichianum Pax, indigenous
 Cryophytum inachabense (Engl.) N.E.Br. accepted as Mesembryanthemum inachabense Engl. indigenous
 Cryophytum intermedium L.Bolus, accepted as Mesembryanthemum longistylum DC. indigenous
 Cryophytum lineare L.Bolus, accepted as Mesembryanthemum longistylum DC. indigenous
 Cryophytum neglectum N.E.Br. accepted as Mesembryanthemum longistylum DC. indigenous
 Cryophytum neilsoniae L.Bolus, accepted as Mesembryanthemum guerichianum Pax, indigenous
 Cryophytum nodiflorum (L.) L.Bolus, accepted as Mesembryanthemum nodiflorum L. indigenous
 Cryophytum paulum N.E.Br. accepted as Mesembryanthemum paulum (N.E.Br.) L.Bolus, indigenous
 Cryophytum planum L.Bolus, accepted as Mesembryanthemum paulum (N.E.Br.) L.Bolus, indigenous
 Cryophytum stenandrum L.Bolus, accepted as Mesembryanthemum stenandrum (L.Bolus) L.Bolus, indigenous
 Cryophytum suaveolens (L.Bolus) J.W.Ingram, accepted as Mesembryanthemum lignescens (L.Bolus) Klak, indigenous
 Cryophytum suffruticosum L.Bolus, accepted as Mesembryanthemum suffruticosum (L.Bolus) Klak, endemic

Cylindrophyllum 
Genus Cylindrophyllum:
 Cylindrophyllum calamiforme (L.) Schwantes, endemic
 Cylindrophyllum comptonii L.Bolus, endemic
 Cylindrophyllum dyeri L.Bolus, accepted as Cylindrophyllum calamiforme (L.) Schwantes, present
 Cylindrophyllum hallii L.Bolus, endemic
 Cylindrophyllum obsubulatum (Haw.) Schwantes, endemic
 Cylindrophyllum tugwelliae L.Bolus, endemic

Dactylopsis 
Genus Dactylopsis:
 Dactylopsis digitata (Aiton) N.E.Br. accepted as Mesembryanthemum digitatum Aiton subsp. digitatum, endemic
 Dactylopsis digitata (Aiton) N.E.Br. subsp. littlewoodii (L.Bolus) Klak, accepted as Mesembryanthemum digitatum Aiton subsp. littlewoodii (L.Bolus) Klak, endemic
 Dactylopsis littlewoodii L.Bolus, accepted as Mesembryanthemum digitatum Aiton subsp. littlewoodii (L.Bolus) Klak, endemic

Deilanthe 
Genus Deilanthe:
 Deilanthe hilmarii (L.Bolus) H.E.K.Hartmann, endemic
 Deilanthe peersii (L.Bolus) N.E.Br. endemic
 Deilanthe thudichumii (L.Bolus) S.A.Hammer, endemic

Delosperma 
Genus Delosperma:
 Delosperma abbottii Van Jaarsv. endemic
 Delosperma aberdeenense (L.Bolus) L.Bolus, endemic
 Delosperma acocksii L.Bolus, endemic
 Delosperma acocksii L.Bolus var. luxurians L.Bolus, accepted as Delosperma acocksii L.Bolus, present
 Delosperma acuminatum L.Bolus, endemic
 Delosperma adelaidense Lavis, endemic
 Delosperma aereum (L.Bolus) L.Bolus, endemic
 Delosperma aereum (L.Bolus) L.Bolus var. album (L.Bolus) L.Bolus, accepted as Delosperma aereum (L.Bolus) L.Bolus, present
 Delosperma affine Lavis, indigenous
 Delosperma algoense L.Bolus, endemic
 Delosperma aliwalense L.Bolus, endemic
 Delosperma alpinum (N.E.Br.) S.A.Hammer & A.P.Dold, endemic
 Delosperma alticola L.Bolus, endemic
 Delosperma angustifolium L.Bolus, accepted as Corpuscularia angustifolia (L.Bolus) H.E.K.Hartmann, present
 Delosperma angustipetalum Lavis, accepted as Corpuscularia angustipetala (Lavis) H.E.K.Hartmann, present
 Delosperma annulare L.Bolus, endemic
 Delosperma appressum L.Bolus, accepted as Corpuscularia appressa (L.Bolus) H.E.K.Hartmann, present
 Delosperma ashtonii L.Bolus, indigenous
 Delosperma asperulum (Salm-Dyck) L.Bolus, accepted as Drosanthemum asperulum (Salm-Dyck) Schwantes, present
 Delosperma ausense L.Bolus, accepted as Delosperma klinghardtianum (Dinter) Schwantes, present
 Delosperma brevipetalum L.Bolus, endemic
 Delosperma brevisepalum L.Bolus, endemic
 Delosperma brevisepalum L.Bolus var. majus L.Bolus, accepted as Delosperma brevisepalum L.Bolus, present
 Delosperma britteniae L.Bolus, accepted as Corpuscularia britteniae (L.Bolus) H.E.K.Hartmann, present
 Delosperma brunnthaleri (A.Berger) Schwantes, endemic
 Delosperma burtoniae L.Bolus, endemic
 Delosperma caespitosum L.Bolus, endemic
 Delosperma caespitosum L.Bolus forma roseum (L.Bolus) L.Bolus, accepted as Delosperma caespitosum L.Bolus, present
 Delosperma calitzdorpense L.Bolus, endemic
 Delosperma calycinum L.Bolus, endemic
 Delosperma carolinense N.E.Br. indigenous
 Delosperma carolinense N.E.Br. var. compacta L.Bolus, accepted as Delosperma carolinense N.E.Br. present
 Delosperma carterae L.Bolus, endemic
 Delosperma clavipes Lavis, indigenous
 Delosperma cloeteae Lavis, endemic
 Delosperma concavum L.Bolus, indigenous
 Delosperma congestum L.Bolus, indigenous
 Delosperma cooperi (Hook.f.) L.Bolus, indigenous
 Delosperma cooperi (Hook.f.) L.Bolus forma bicolor (L.Bolus) G.D.Rowley, accepted as Delosperma cooperi (Hook.f.) L.Bolus, present
 Delosperma crassuloides (Haw.) L.Bolus, indigenous
 Delosperma crassum L.Bolus, endemic
 Delosperma cronemeyerianum (A.Berger) H.Jacobsen, endemic
 Delosperma davyi N.E.Br. endemic
 Delosperma deilanthoides S.A.Hammer, endemic
 Delosperma deleeuwiae Lavis, indigenous
 Delosperma denticulatum L.Bolus, endemic
 Delosperma dolomiticum Van Jaarsv. accepted as Delosperma vandermerwei L.Bolus, present
 Delosperma dunense L.Bolus, endemic
 Delosperma dyeri L.Bolus, endemic
 Delosperma dyeri L.Bolus var. laxum L.Bolus, accepted as Delosperma dyeri L.Bolus, present
 Delosperma echinatum (Aiton) Schwantes, accepted as Delosperma echinatum (Lam.) Schwantes, present
 Delosperma echinatum (Lam.) Schwantes, endemic
 Delosperma ecklonis (Salm-Dyck) Schwantes, endemic
 Delosperma ecklonis (Salm-Dyck) Schwantes var. latifolia L.Bolus, accepted as Delosperma ecklonis (Salm-Dyck) Schwantes, present
 Delosperma edwardsiae L.Bolus, accepted as Delosperma rogersii (Schonland & A.Berger) L.Bolus, present
 Delosperma erectum L.Bolus, endemic
 Delosperma esterhuyseniae L.Bolus, endemic
 Delosperma exspersum (N.E.Br.) L.Bolus, accepted as Drosanthemum expersum (N.E.Br.) Schwantes, present
 Delosperma exspersum (N.E.Br.) L.Bolus var. decumbens L.Bolus, accepted as Drosanthemum expersum (N.E.Br.) Schwantes, present
 Delosperma ficksburgense Lavis, endemic
 Delosperma floribundum L.Bolus, endemic
 Delosperma framesii L.Bolus, endemic
 Delosperma fredericii Lavis, endemic
 Delosperma frutescens L.Bolus, endemic
 Delosperma galpinii L.Bolus, indigenous
 Delosperma galpinii L.Bolus var. minus L.Bolus, accepted as Delosperma galpinii L.Bolus, present
 Delosperma gautengense H.E.K.Hartmann, endemic
 Delosperma giffenii Lavis, endemic
 Delosperma gracile L.Bolus, endemic
 Delosperma gracillimum L.Bolus, accepted as Corpuscularia gracillima (L.Bolus) Niederle, endemic
 Delosperma gramineum L.Bolus, endemic
 Delosperma grandiflorum L.Bolus, accepted as Drosanthemum longipes (L.Bolus) H.E.K.Hartmann, present
 Delosperma grantiae L.Bolus, endemic
 Delosperma gratiae L.Bolus, endemic
 Delosperma guthriei Lavis, endemic
 Delosperma hallii L.Bolus, accepted as Hartmanthus halii (L.Bolus) S.A.Hammer, present
 Delosperma herbeum (N.E.Br.) N.E.Br. indigenous
 Delosperma hirtum (N.E.Br.) Schwantes, indigenous
 Delosperma hirtum (N.E.Br.) Schwantes var. bicolor L.Bolus, accepted as Delosperma hirtum (N.E.Br.) Schwantes, present
 Delosperma hollandii L.Bolus, endemic
 Delosperma imbricatum L.Bolus, endemic
 Delosperma inaequale L.Bolus, endemic
 Delosperma incomptum (Haw.) L.Bolus, endemic
 Delosperma incomptum (Haw.) L.Bolus var. ecklonis (Salm-Dyck) H.Jacobsen, accepted as Delosperma invalidum (N.E.Br.) H.E.K.Hartmann, present
 Delosperma incomptum (Haw.) L.Bolus var. gracile L.Bolus, accepted as Delosperma incomptum (Haw.) L.Bolus, present
 Delosperma inconspicuum L.Bolus, endemic
 Delosperma intonsum L.Bolus, endemic
 Delosperma invalidum (N.E.Br.) H.E.K.Hartmann, endemic
 Delosperma jansei N.E.Br. endemic
 Delosperma karrooicum L.Bolus, endemic
 Delosperma katbergense L.Bolus, endemic
 Delosperma katbergense L.Bolus var. amatolense L.Bolus, accepted as Delosperma katbergense L.Bolus, present
 Delosperma katbergense L.Bolus var. angustifolium L.Bolus, accepted as Delosperma katbergense L.Bolus, present
 Delosperma klinghardtianum (Dinter) Schwantes, indigenous
 Delosperma knox-daviesii Lavis, endemic
 Delosperma kofleri Lavis, indigenous
 Delosperma lavisiae L.Bolus, indigenous
 Delosperma lavisiae L.Bolus var. parisepalum L.Bolus, accepted as Delosperma lavisiae L.Bolus
 Delosperma laxipetalum L.Bolus, endemic
 Delosperma lebomboense (L.Bolus) Lavis, indigenous
 Delosperma leendertziae N.E.Br. endemic
 Delosperma lehmannii (Eckl. & Zeyh.) Schwantes, accepted as Corpuscularia lehmannii (Eckl. & Zeyh.) Schwantes, present
 Delosperma leightoniae Lavis, endemic
 Delosperma liebenbergii L.Bolus, endemic
 Delosperma lineare L.Bolus, indigenous
 Delosperma lineare L.Bolus var. tenuifolium L.Bolus, accepted as Delosperma lineare L.Bolus
 Delosperma litorale (Kensit) L.Bolus, endemic
 Delosperma longipes L.Bolus, accepted as Drosanthemum longipes (L.Bolus) H.E.K.Hartmann, present
 Delosperma lootsbergense Lavis, endemic
 Delosperma luckhoffii L.Bolus, endemic
 Delosperma luteum L.Bolus, endemic
 Delosperma lydenburgense L.Bolus, endemic
 Delosperma lydenburgense L.Bolus var. acutipetalum L.Bolus, accepted as Delosperma lydenburgense L.Bolus, present
 Delosperma macellum (N.E.Br.) N.E.Br. indigenous
 Delosperma macrostigma L.Bolus, endemic
 Delosperma mahonii (N.E.Br.) N.E.Br. indigenous
 Delosperma mariae L.Bolus, endemic
 Delosperma maxwelliae L.Bolus, endemic
 Delosperma minimum Lavis, accepted as Corpuscularia taylori (N.E.Br.) Schwantes, present
 Delosperma monanthemum Lavis, endemic
 Delosperma muiri L.Bolus, endemic
 Delosperma multiflorum L.Bolus, endemic
 Delosperma neethlingiae (L.Bolus) Schwantes, endemic
 Delosperma nubigenum (Schltr.) L.Bolus, indigenous
 Delosperma obtusum L.Bolus, endemic
 Delosperma ornatulum N.E.Br. endemic
 Delosperma pachyrhizum L.Bolus, indigenous
 Delosperma pachyrhizum L.Bolus var. pubescens L.Bolus, accepted as Delosperma pachyrhizum L.Bolus, present
 Delosperma pageanum (L.Bolus) L.Bolus, endemic
 Delosperma pallidum L.Bolus, endemic
 Delosperma papillatum (L.Bolus) L.Bolus, accepted as Drosanthemum papillatum L.Bolus, present
 Delosperma parviflorum L.Bolus, endemic
 Delosperma patersoniae (L.Bolus) L.Bolus, endemic
 Delosperma peersii Lavis, endemic
 Delosperma peglerae L.Bolus, endemic
 Delosperma pergamentaceum L.Bolus, accepted as Hartmanthus pergamentaceus (L.Bolus) S.A.Hammer, present
 Delosperma pergamentaceum L.Bolus var. roseum Lavis, accepted as Hartmanthus pergamentaceus (L.Bolus) S.A.Hammer, present
 Delosperma platysepalum L.Bolus, endemic
 Delosperma pondoense L.Bolus, endemic
 Delosperma pontii L.Bolus, accepted as Delosperma floribundum L.Bolus, present
 Delosperma pottsii (L.Bolus) L.Bolus, endemic
 Delosperma prasinum L.Bolus, endemic
 Delosperma pruinosum (Thunb.) J.W.Ingram, accepted as Delosperma echinatum (Lam.) Schwantes, present
 Delosperma pubipetalum L.Bolus, accepted as Drosanthemum papillatum L.Bolus, present
 Delosperma purpureum H.E.K.Hartmann, endemic
 Delosperma repens L.Bolus, endemic
 Delosperma reynoldsii Lavis, indigenous
 Delosperma rileyi L.Bolus, endemic
 Delosperma robustum L.Bolus, endemic
 Delosperma rogersii (Schonland & A.Berger) L.Bolus, endemic
 Delosperma rogersii (Schonland & A.Berger) L.Bolus var. glabrescens L.Bolus, accepted as Delosperma rogersii (Schonland & A.Berger) L.Bolus, present
 Delosperma roseopurpureum Lavis, indigenous
 Delosperma saturatum L.Bolus, endemic
 Delosperma saxicola Lavis, endemic
 Delosperma scabripes L.Bolus, indigenous
 Delosperma smythae L.Bolus, endemic
 Delosperma sphalmanthoides S.A.Hammer, endemic
 Delosperma stenandrum L.Bolus, endemic
 Delosperma subclavatum L.Bolus, endemic
 Delosperma subincanum (Haw.) Schwantes, endemic
 Delosperma subpetiolatum L.Bolus, endemic
 Delosperma sulcatum L.Bolus, endemic
 Delosperma sutherlandii (Hook.f.) N.E.Br. endemic
 Delosperma suttoniae Lavis, endemic
 Delosperma taylori (N.E.Br.) Schwantes, accepted as Corpuscularia taylori (N.E.Br.) Schwantes, present
 Delosperma taylori (N.E.Br.) Schwantes var. albanense L.Bolus, accepted as Corpuscularia taylori (N.E.Br.) Schwantes, present
 Delosperma testaceum (Haw.) Schwantes, endemic
 Delosperma tradescantioides (A.Berger) L.Bolus, indigenous
 Delosperma truteri Lavis, endemic
 Delosperma uitenhagense L.Bolus, endemic
 Delosperma uncinatum L.Bolus, endemic
 Delosperma uniflorum L.Bolus, endemic
 Delosperma vandermerwei L.Bolus, endemic
 Delosperma velutinum L.Bolus, indigenous
 Delosperma verecundum L.Bolus, endemic
 Delosperma vernicolor L.Bolus, endemic
 Delosperma versicolor L.Bolus, endemic
 Delosperma vinaceum (L.Bolus) L.Bolus, endemic
 Delosperma virens L.Bolus, endemic
 Delosperma vogtsii L.Bolus, endemic
 Delosperma waterbergense L.Bolus, endemic
 Delosperma wethamae L.Bolus, indigenous
 Delosperma wilmaniae Lavis, endemic
 Delosperma wiumii Lavis, endemic
 Delosperma zeederbergii L.Bolus, endemic
 Delosperma zoeae L.Bolus, endemic
 Delosperma zoutpansbergense L.Bolus, endemic

Dicrocaulon 
Genus Dicrocaulon:
 Dicrocaulon brevifolium N.E.Br. endemic
 Dicrocaulon grandiflorum Ihlenf. endemic
 Dicrocaulon humile N.E.Br. endemic
 Dicrocaulon microstigma (L.Bolus) Ihlenf. endemic
 Dicrocaulon nodosum (A.Berger) N.E.Br. endemic
 Dicrocaulon ramulosum (L.Bolus) Ihlenf. endemic
 Dicrocaulon spissum N.E.Br. endemic
 Dicrocaulon trichotomum (Thunb.) N.E.Br. accepted as Mesembryanthemum trichotomum Thunb. indigenous

Didymaotus 
Genus Didymaotus:
 Didymaotus lapidiformis (Marloth) N.E.Br. endemic

Dinteranthus 
Genus Dinteranthus:
 Dinteranthus microspermus (Dinter & Derenb.) Schwantes subsp. puberulus (N.E.Br.) N.Sauer, accepted as Dinteranthus puberulus N.E.Br.
 Dinteranthus microspermus (Dinter & Derenb.) Schwantes var. acutipetalus L.Bolus, accepted as Dinteranthus puberulus N.E.Br.
 Dinteranthus pole-evansii (N.E.Br.) Schwantes, endemic
 Dinteranthus puberulus N.E.Br. endemic
 Dinteranthus vanzylii (L.Bolus) Schwantes, endemic
 Dinteranthus wilmotianus L.Bolus, endemic
 Dinteranthus wilmotianus L.Bolus subsp. impunctatus N.Sauer, accepted as Dinteranthus inexpectatus Dinter ex H.Jacobsen, present

Diplosoma 
Genus Diplosoma:
 Diplosoma luckhoffii (L.Bolus) Schwantes ex Ihlenf. endemic
 Diplosoma retroversum (Kensit) Schwantes, endemic

Disphyma 
Genus Disphyma:
 Disphyma crassifolium (L.) L.Bolus, endemic
 Disphyma dunsdonii L.Bolus, endemic

Dorotheanthus 
Genus Dorotheanthus:
 Dorotheanthus apetalus (L.f.) N.E.Br. accepted as Cleretum apetalum (L.f.) N.E.Br. endemic
 Dorotheanthus bellidiformis (Burm.f.) N.E.Br. accepted as Cleretum bellidiforme (Burm.f.) G.D.Rowley, present
 Dorotheanthus bellidiformis (Burm.f.) N.E.Br. subsp. hestermalensis Ihlenf. & Struck, accepted as Cleretum bellidiforme (Burm.f.) G.D.Rowley, endemic
 Dorotheanthus booysenii L.Bolus, accepted as Cleretum booysenii (L.Bolus) Klak, endemic
 Dorotheanthus clavatus (Haw.) Struck, accepted as Cleretum clavatum (Haw.) Klak, endemic
 Dorotheanthus gramineus (Haw.) Schwantes, accepted as Cleretum apetalum (L.f.) N.E.Br. present
 Dorotheanthus maughanii (N.E.Br.) Ihlenf. & Struck, accepted as Cleretum maughanii (N.E.Br.) Klak, endemic
 Dorotheanthus rourkei L.Bolus, accepted as Cleretum rourkei (L.Bolus) Klak, endemic
 Dorotheanthus ulularis Brusse, endemic

Dracophilus 
Genus Dracophilus:
 Dracophilus dealbatus (N.E.Br.) Walgate, indigenous
 Dracophilus montis-draconis (Dinter) Dinter & Schwantes, accepted as Dracophilus dealbatus (N.E.Br.) Walgate
 Dracophilus proximus (L.Bolus) Walgate, accepted as Dracophilus dealbatus (N.E.Br.) Walgate, present

Drosanthemopsis 
Genus Drosanthemopsis:
 Drosanthemopsis salaria (L.Bolus) Rauschert, accepted as Jacobsenia vaginata (L.Bolus) Ihlenf. present
 Drosanthemopsis vaginata (L.Bolus) Rauschert, accepted as Jacobsenia vaginata (L.Bolus) Ihlenf. present

Drosanthemum 
Genus Drosanthemum:
 Drosanthemum acuminatum L.Bolus, endemic
 Drosanthemum acutifolium (L.Bolus) L.Bolus, endemic
 Drosanthemum albens L.Bolus, indigenous
 Drosanthemum albiflorum (L.Bolus) Schwantes, endemic
 Drosanthemum ambiguum L.Bolus, endemic
 Drosanthemum anomalum L.Bolus, endemic
 Drosanthemum archeri L.Bolus, endemic
 Drosanthemum asperulum (Salm-Dyck) Schwantes, endemic
 Drosanthemum attenuatum (Haw.) Schwantes, endemic
 Drosanthemum aureopurpureum L.Bolus, endemic
 Drosanthemum austricola L.Bolus, endemic
 Drosanthemum autumnale L.Bolus, endemic
 Drosanthemum badpoortensis Van Jaarsv. endemic
 Drosanthemum barkerae L.Bolus, endemic
 Drosanthemum barwickii L.Bolus, accepted as Drosanthemum subcompressum (Haw.) Schwantes, present
 Drosanthemum bellum L.Bolus, endemic
 Drosanthemum bicolor L.Bolus, endemic
 Drosanthemum boerhavii (Eckl. & Zeyh.) H.E.K.Hartmann, endemic
 Drosanthemum breve L.Bolus, endemic
 Drosanthemum brevifolium (Aiton) Schwantes, indigenous
 Drosanthemum calycinum (Haw.) Schwantes, endemic
 Drosanthemum candens (Haw.) Schwantes, endemic
 Drosanthemum capillare (Thunb.) Schwantes, endemic
 Drosanthemum cereale L.Bolus, endemic
 Drosanthemum chrysum L.Bolus, endemic
 Drosanthemum collinum (Sond.) Schwantes, endemic
 Drosanthemum comptonii L.Bolus, endemic
 Drosanthemum concavum L.Bolus, endemic
 Drosanthemum crassum L.Bolus, endemic
 Drosanthemum croceum L.Bolus, accepted as Drosanthemum pulchrum L.Bolus, endemic
 Drosanthemum curtophyllum L.Bolus, indigenous
 Drosanthemum cymiferum L.Bolus, endemic
 Drosanthemum deciduum H.E.K.Hartmann & Bruckm. endemic
 Drosanthemum dejagerae L.Bolus, endemic
 Drosanthemum delicatulum (L.Bolus) Schwantes, endemic
 Drosanthemum dipageae H.E.K.Hartmann, endemic
 Drosanthemum diversifolium L.Bolus, endemic
 Drosanthemum duplessiae L.Bolus, endemic
 Drosanthemum eburneum L.Bolus, endemic
 Drosanthemum edwardsiae L.Bolus, endemic
 Drosanthemum erigeriflorum (Jacq.) Stearn, endemic
 Drosanthemum expersum (N.E.Br.) Schwantes, endemic
 Drosanthemum filiforme L.Bolus, endemic
 Drosanthemum flammeum L.Bolus, endemic
 Drosanthemum flavum (Haw.) Schwantes, endemic
 Drosanthemum floribundum (Haw.) Schwantes, endemic
 Drosanthemum fourcadei (L.Bolus) Schwantes, endemic
 Drosanthemum framesii L.Bolus, endemic
 Drosanthemum fulleri L.Bolus, endemic
 Drosanthemum giffenii (L.Bolus) Schwantes, endemic
 Drosanthemum giffenii (L.Bolus) Schwantes var. intertextum (L.Bolus) Schwantes, accepted as Drosanthemum giffenii (L.Bolus) Schwantes, present
 Drosanthemum glabrescens L.Bolus, endemic
 Drosanthemum globosum L.Bolus, endemic
 Drosanthemum godmaniae L.Bolus, endemic
 Drosanthemum gracillimum L.Bolus, endemic
 Drosanthemum hallii L.Bolus, endemic
 Drosanthemum hirtellum (Haw.) Schwantes, endemic
 Drosanthemum hispidum (L.) Schwantes, indigenous
 Drosanthemum hispidum (L.) Schwantes var. platypetalum (Haw.) Schwantes, accepted as Drosanthemum hispidum (L.) Schwantes, present
 Drosanthemum hispifolium (Haw.) Schwantes, endemic
 Drosanthemum inornatum (L.Bolus) L.Bolus, indigenous
 Drosanthemum insolitum L.Bolus, accepted as Drosanthemum boerhavii (Eckl. & Zeyh.) H.E.K.Hartmann, endemic
 Drosanthemum intermedium (L.Bolus) L.Bolus, endemic
 Drosanthemum jamesii L.Bolus, endemic
 Drosanthemum karrooense L.Bolus, endemic
 Drosanthemum latipetalum L.Bolus, endemic
 Drosanthemum lavisii L.Bolus, endemic
 Drosanthemum laxum L.Bolus, endemic
 Drosanthemum leipoldtii L.Bolus, endemic
 Drosanthemum leptum L.Bolus, endemic
 Drosanthemum lignosum L.Bolus, endemic
 Drosanthemum lique (N.E.Br.) Schwantes, endemic
 Drosanthemum littlewoodii L.Bolus, accepted as Drosanthemum albens L.Bolus
 Drosanthemum longipes (L.Bolus) H.E.K.Hartmann, endemic
 Drosanthemum luederitzii (Engl.) Schwantes, indigenous
 Drosanthemum macrocalyx L.Bolus, endemic
 Drosanthemum maculatum (Haw.) Schwantes, endemic
 Drosanthemum marinum L.Bolus, endemic
 Drosanthemum martinii L.Bolus, accepted as Dorotheanthus bellidiformis (Burm.f.) N.E.Br. subsp. bellidiformis, present
 Drosanthemum mathewsii L.Bolus, endemic
 Drosanthemum micans (L.) Schwantes, endemic
 Drosanthemum montaguense L.Bolus, accepted as Drosanthemum praecultum (N.E.Br.) Schwantes, present
 Drosanthemum muiri L.Bolus, endemic
 Drosanthemum nitidum (Haw.) Schwantes, accepted as Mesembryanthemum nitidum Haw. indigenous
 Drosanthemum oculatum L.Bolus, endemic
 Drosanthemum opacum L.Bolus, endemic
 Drosanthemum pallens (Haw.) Schwantes, endemic
 Drosanthemum papillatum L.Bolus, endemic
 Drosanthemum parvifolium (Haw.) Schwantes, endemic
 Drosanthemum paxianum (Schltr. & Diels) Schwantes, accepted as Drosanthemum luederitzii (Engl.) Schwantes, present
 Drosanthemum pickhardii L.Bolus, accepted as Drosanthemum speciosum (Haw.) Schwantes, endemic
 Drosanthemum praecultum (N.E.Br.) Schwantes, endemic
 Drosanthemum prostratum L.Bolus, endemic
 Drosanthemum pulchellum L.Bolus, endemic
 Drosanthemum pulchrum L.Bolus, endemic
 Drosanthemum pulverulentum (Haw.) Schwantes, endemic
 Drosanthemum quadratum Klak, endemic
 Drosanthemum ramosissimum (Schltr.) L.Bolus, endemic
 Drosanthemum roridum L.Bolus, accepted as Drosanthemum subcompressum (Haw.) Schwantes, present
 Drosanthemum roseatum (N.E.Br.) L.Bolus, accepted as Drosanthemum pulverulentum (Haw.) Schwantes, present
 Drosanthemum salicola L.Bolus, endemic
 Drosanthemum schoenlandianum (Schltr.) L.Bolus, endemic
 Drosanthemum semiglobosum L.Bolus, endemic
 Drosanthemum sessile (Thunb.) Schwantes, accepted as Ruschia sessilis (Thunb.) H.E.K.Hartmann
 Drosanthemum speciosum (Haw.) Schwantes, endemic
 Drosanthemum splendens L.Bolus, accepted as Drosanthemum speciosum (Haw.) Schwantes, endemic
 Drosanthemum stokoei L.Bolus, endemic
 Drosanthemum striatum (Haw.) Schwantes, endemic
 Drosanthemum striatum (Haw.) Schwantes var. hispifolium (Haw.) G.D.Rowley, accepted as Drosanthemum hispifolium (Haw.) Schwantes, present
 Drosanthemum striatum (Haw.) Schwantes var. pallens (Haw.) G.D.Rowley, accepted as Drosanthemum pallens (Haw.) Schwantes, present
 Drosanthemum strictifolium L.Bolus, accepted as Drosanthemum boerhavii (Eckl. & Zeyh.) H.E.K.Hartmann, endemic
 Drosanthemum subalbum L.Bolus, accepted as Drosanthemum diversifolium L.Bolus, present
 Drosanthemum subclausum L.Bolus, endemic
 Drosanthemum subcompressum (Haw.) Schwantes, endemic
 Drosanthemum subglobosum (Haw.) Schwantes, accepted as Drosanthemum capillare (Thunb.) Schwantes, present
 Drosanthemum subplanum L.Bolus, endemic
 Drosanthemum subspinosum (Kuntze) H.E.K.Hartmann, endemic
 Drosanthemum tardum L.Bolus, endemic
 Drosanthemum thudichumii L.Bolus, endemic
 Drosanthemum thudichumii L.Bolus var. gracilius L.Bolus, accepted as Drosanthemum thudichumii L.Bolus, indigenous
 Drosanthemum thudichumii L.Bolus var. gracilius L.Bolus forma aurantiac L.Bolus, accepted as Drosanthemum thudichumii L.Bolus, present
 Drosanthemum thudichumii L.Bolus var. gracilius L.Bolus forma aurea, accepted as Drosanthemum thudichumii L.Bolus, present
 Drosanthemum torquatum (Haw.) Schwantes, accepted as Drosanthemum floribundum (Haw.) Schwantes, present
 Drosanthemum tuberculiferum L.Bolus, endemic
 Drosanthemum uniflorum (L.Bolus) Friedrich ex H.Jacobsen, accepted as Lampranthus uniflorus (L.Bolus) L.Bolus, present
 Drosanthemum vandermerwei L.Bolus, endemic
 Drosanthemum vespertinum L.Bolus, endemic
 Drosanthemum vespertinum L.Bolus var. suffusum L.Bolus, accepted as Drosanthemum vespertinum L.Bolus, present
 Drosanthemum wittebergense L.Bolus, endemic
 Drosanthemum worcesterense L.Bolus, endemic
 Drosanthemum zygophylloides (L.Bolus) L.Bolus, endemic

Eberlanzia 
Genus Eberlanzia:
 Eberlanzia aculeata (N.E.Br.) Schwantes, accepted as Ruschia spinosa (L.) Dehn, present
 Eberlanzia albertensis (L.Bolus) L.Bolus, accepted as Ruschia spinosa (L.) Dehn, present
 Eberlanzia armata (L.Bolus) L.Bolus, accepted as Arenifera stylosa (L.Bolus) H.E.K.Hartmann, present
 Eberlanzia cradockensis (Kuntze) Schwantes, accepted as Ruschia cradockensis (Kuntze) H.E.K.Hartmann & Stuber subsp. cradockensis, present
 Eberlanzia cyathiformis (L.Bolus) H.E.K.Hartmann, indigenous
 Eberlanzia dichotoma (L.Bolus) H.E.K.Hartmann, endemic
 Eberlanzia disarticulata (L.Bolus) L.Bolus, accepted as Antimima hantamensis (Engl.) H.E.K.Hartmann & Stuber, present
 Eberlanzia divaricata (L.Bolus) L.Bolus, accepted as Ruschia divaricata L.Bolus, present
 Eberlanzia ebracteata (L.Bolus) H.E.K.Hartmann, indigenous
 Eberlanzia ferox (L.Bolus) L.Bolus, accepted as Ruschia intricata (N.E.Br.) H.E.K.Hartmann & Stuber, present
 Eberlanzia globularis (L.Bolus) L.Bolus, accepted as Ruschia spinosa (L.) Dehn, present
 Eberlanzia gravida (L.Bolus) H.E.K.Hartmann, endemic
 Eberlanzia horrescens (L.Bolus) L.Bolus, accepted as Ruschia cradockensis (Kuntze) H.E.K.Hartmann & Stuber subsp. cradockensis, present
 Eberlanzia horrescens (L.Bolus) L.Bolus var. densa(L.Bolus) H.Jacobsen, accepted as Ruschia cradockensis (Kuntze) H.E.K.Hartmann & Stuber subsp. cradockensis, present
 Eberlanzia horrida (L.Bolus) L.Bolus, accepted as Ruschia cradockensis (Kuntze) H.E.K.Hartmann & Stuber subsp. cradockensis, present
 Eberlanzia hospitalis (Dinter) Schwantes, accepted as Ruschia spinosa (L.) Dehn, present
 Eberlanzia intricata (N.E.Br.) Schwantes, accepted as Ruschia intricata (N.E.Br.) H.E.K.Hartmann & Stuber, present
 Eberlanzia macroura (L.Bolus) L.Bolus, accepted as Ruschia spinosa (L.) Dehn, present
 Eberlanzia micrantha (Pax) Schwantes, accepted as Ruschia spinosa (L.) Dehn, present
 Eberlanzia mucronifera (Haw.) Schwantes, accepted as Ruschia spinosa (L.) Dehn, present
 Eberlanzia munita (L.Bolus) Schwantes, accepted as Ruschia intricata (N.E.Br.) H.E.K.Hartmann & Stuber, present
 Eberlanzia parvibracteata (L.Bolus) H.E.K.Hartmann, endemic
 Eberlanzia persistens (L.Bolus) L.Bolus, accepted as Ruschia intricata (N.E.Br.) H.E.K.Hartmann & Stuber, present
 Eberlanzia puniens (L.Bolus) L.Bolus, accepted as Ruschia intricata (N.E.Br.) H.E.K.Hartmann & Stuber, present
 Eberlanzia schneideriana (A.Berger) H.E.K.Hartmann, indigenous
 Eberlanzia sedoides (Dinter & A.Berger) Schwantes, indigenous
 Eberlanzia spinosa (L.) Schwantes, accepted as Ruschia spinosa (L.) Dehn, present
 Eberlanzia stylosa (L.Bolus) L.Bolus, accepted as Arenifera stylosa (L.Bolus) H.E.K.Hartmann, present
 Eberlanzia tatasbergensis L.Bolus, accepted as Ruschia divaricata L.Bolus, present
 Eberlanzia triticiformis (L.Bolus) L.Bolus, accepted as Ruschia cradockensis (Kuntze) H.E.K.Hartmann & Stuber subsp. triticiformis (L.Bolus) H.E.K.Hartmann, present
 Eberlanzia triticiformis (L.Bolus) L.Bolus var. subglobosaL.Bolus, accepted as Ruschia cradockensis (Kuntze) H.E.K.Hartmann & Stuber subsp. triticiformis (L.Bolus) H.E.K.Hartmann, present
 Eberlanzia vanheerdei L.Bolus, accepted as Leipoldtia alborosea (L.Bolus) H.E.K.Hartmann & Stuber, present
 Eberlanzia vulnerans (L.Bolus) L.Bolus, accepted as Ruschia divaricata L.Bolus, present

Ebracteola 
Genus Ebracteola:
 Ebracteola candida L.Bolus, accepted as Ebracteola derenbergiana (Dinter) Dinter & Schwantes
 Ebracteola derenbergiana (Dinter) Dinter & Schwantes, indigenous
 Ebracteola fulleri (L.Bolus) Glen, indigenous
 Ebracteola wilmaniae (L.Bolus) Glen, endemic

Ectotropis 
Genus Ectotropis:
 Ectotropis alpina N.E.Br. accepted as Delosperma alpinum (N.E.Br.) S.A.Hammer & A.P.Dold, present

Enarganthe 
Genus Enarganthe:
 Enarganthe octonaria (L.Bolus) N.E.Br. endemic

Erepsia 
Genus Erepsia:
 Erepsia anceps (Haw.) Schwantes, endemic
 Erepsia aperta L.Bolus, endemic
 Erepsia aristata (L.Bolus) Liede & H.E.K.Hartmann, endemic
 Erepsia aspera (Haw.) L.Bolus, endemic
 Erepsia babiloniae Liede, endemic
 Erepsia bracteata (Aiton) Schwantes, endemic
 Erepsia brevipetala L.Bolus, endemic
 Erepsia caledonica L.Bolus, accepted as Erepsia hybrid, present
 Erepsia carterae L.Bolus, accepted as Erepsia gracilis (Haw.) L.Bolus, present
 Erepsia carterae L.Bolus var. leptaL.Bolus, accepted as Erepsia gracilis (Haw.) L.Bolus, present
 Erepsia compressa (Haw.) Schwantes, accepted as Erepsia hybrid, present
 Erepsia distans L.Bolus, endemic
 Erepsia dubia Liede, endemic
 Erepsia dunensis (Sond.) Klak, endemic
 Erepsia esterhuyseniae L.Bolus, endemic
 Erepsia forficata (L.) Schwantes, endemic
 Erepsia gracilis (Haw.) L.Bolus, endemic
 Erepsia hallii L.Bolus, endemic
 Erepsia heteropetala (Haw.) Schwantes, endemic
 Erepsia inclaudens (Haw.) Schwantes, endemic
 Erepsia insignis (Schltr.) Schwantes, endemic
 Erepsia lacera (Haw.) Liede, endemic
 Erepsia laxa L.Bolus, accepted as Erepsia anceps (Haw.) Schwantes, present
 Erepsia levis L.Bolus, accepted as Erepsia gracilis (Haw.) L.Bolus, present
 Erepsia marlothii N.E.Br. accepted as Erepsia saturata L.Bolus, present
 Erepsia mutabilis (Haw.) Schwantes, accepted as Erepsia forficata (L.) Schwantes, present
 Erepsia nudicaulis (A.Berger) H.Jacobsen, accepted as Erepsia aspera (Haw.) L.Bolus, present
 Erepsia oxysepala (Schltr.) L.Bolus, endemic
 Erepsia pageae L.Bolus, accepted as Erepsia patula (Haw.) Schwantes, present
 Erepsia patula (Haw.) Schwantes, endemic
 Erepsia pentagona (L.Bolus) L.Bolus, endemic
 Erepsia pillansii (Kensit) Liede, endemic
 Erepsia polita (L.Bolus) L.Bolus, endemic
 Erepsia polypetala (A.Berger & Schltr.) L.Bolus, endemic
 Erepsia promontorii L.Bolus, endemic
 Erepsia racemosa (N.E.Br.) Schwantes, accepted as Erepsia bracteata (Aiton) Schwantes, present
 Erepsia radiata (Haw.) Schwantes, accepted as Erepsia bracteata (Aiton) Schwantes, present
 Erepsia ramosa L.Bolus, endemic
 Erepsia roseo-alba L.Bolus, accepted as Erepsia ramosa L.Bolus, present
 Erepsia saturata L.Bolus, endemic
 Erepsia serrata (L.) L.Bolus, accepted as Circandra serrata (L.) N.E.Br. present
 Erepsia simulans (L.Bolus) Klak, endemic
 Erepsia steytlerae L.Bolus, endemic
 Erepsia tenuicaulis (A.Berger) H.Jacobsen, accepted as Erepsia gracilis (Haw.) L.Bolus, present
 Erepsia tuberculata N.E.Br. accepted as Erepsia aspera (Haw.) L.Bolus, present
 Erepsia urbaniana (Schltr.) Schwantes, accepted as Lampranthus emarginatus (L.) N.E.Br. endemic
 Erepsia villiersii L.Bolus, endemic

Esterhuysenia 
Genus Esterhuysenia:
 Esterhuysenia alpina L.Bolus, endemic
 Esterhuysenia drepanophylla (Schltr. & A.Berger) H.E.K.Hartmann, endemic
 Esterhuysenia grahambeckii Van Jaarsv. accepted as Roosia grahambeckii (Van Jaarsv.) Van Jaarsv. endemic
 Esterhuysenia inclaudens (L.Bolus) H.E.K.Hartmann, endemic
 Esterhuysenia lucilleae Van Jaarsv. accepted as Roosia lucilleae (Van Jaarsv.) Van Jaarsv. endemic
 Esterhuysenia mucronata (L.Bolus) Klak, endemic
 Esterhuysenia stokoei (L.Bolus) H.E.K.Hartmann, endemic

Eurystigma 
Genus Eurystigma:
 Eurystigma clavatum (L.Bolus) L.Bolus, accepted as Mesembryanthemum eurystigmatum Gerbaulet, present

Faucaria 
Genus Faucaria:
 Faucaria acutipetala L.Bolus, accepted as Faucaria felina (L.) Schwantes, present
 Faucaria albidens N.E.Br. accepted as Faucaria bosscheana (A.Berger) Schwantes, present
 Faucaria bosscheana (A.Berger) Schwantes, endemic
 Faucaria bosscheana (A.Berger) Schwantes var. haagei(Tischer) H.Jacobsen, accepted as Faucaria bosscheana (A.Berger) Schwantes, present
 Faucaria britteniae L.Bolus, endemic
 Faucaria candida L.Bolus, accepted as Faucaria felina (L.) Schwantes, present
 Faucaria coronata L.Bolus, accepted as Faucaria britteniae L.Bolus, present
 Faucaria cradockensis L.Bolus, accepted as Faucaria felina (L.) Schwantes, present
 Faucaria crassisepala L.Bolus, accepted as Faucaria felina (L.) Schwantes, present
 Faucaria duncanii L.Bolus, accepted as Faucaria felina (L.) Schwantes, present
 Faucaria felina (L.) Schwantes, endemic
 Faucaria felina (L.) Schwantes subsp. tuberculosa (Rolfe) L.E.Groen, accepted as Faucaria tuberculosa (Rolfe) Schwantes, present
 Faucaria felina (L.) Schwantes var. jamesiiL.Bolus, accepted as Faucaria felina (L.) Schwantes, present
 Faucaria felina (Weston) Schwantes subsp. britteniae (L.Bolus) L.E.Groen, accepted as Faucaria britteniae L.Bolus, present
 Faucaria grandis L.Bolus, accepted as Faucaria britteniae L.Bolus, present
 Faucaria gratiae L.Bolus, endemic
 Faucaria hooleae L.Bolus, accepted as Faucaria gratiae L.Bolus, present
 Faucaria kingiae L.Bolus, accepted as Faucaria felina (L.) Schwantes, present
 Faucaria latipetala L.Bolus, accepted as Faucaria felina (L.) Schwantes, present
 Faucaria laxipetala L.Bolus, accepted as Faucaria felina (L.) Schwantes, present
 Faucaria longidens L.Bolus, accepted as Faucaria felina (L.) Schwantes, present
 Faucaria longifolia L.Bolus, accepted as Faucaria felina (L.) Schwantes, present
 Faucaria lupina (Haw.) Schwantes, accepted as Faucaria felina (L.) Schwantes, present
 Faucaria militaris Tischer, accepted as Faucaria felina (L.) Schwantes, present
 Faucaria montana L.Bolus, accepted as Faucaria felina (L.) Schwantes, present
 Faucaria multidens L.Bolus, accepted as Faucaria felina (L.) Schwantes, present
 Faucaria multidens L.Bolus var. paardeportensisL.Bolus, accepted as Faucaria felina (L.) Schwantes, present
 Faucaria nemorosa L.Bolus ex L.E.Groen, endemic
 Faucaria paucidens N.E.Br. accepted as Faucaria bosscheana (A.Berger) Schwantes, present
 Faucaria peersii L.Bolus, accepted as Faucaria bosscheana (A.Berger) Schwantes, present
 Faucaria plana L.Bolus, accepted as Faucaria felina (L.) Schwantes, present
 Faucaria ryneveldiae L.Bolus, accepted as Faucaria felina (L.) Schwantes, present
 Faucaria smithii L.Bolus, accepted as Faucaria britteniae L.Bolus, present
 Faucaria speciosa L.Bolus, accepted as Faucaria britteniae L.Bolus, present
 Faucaria subindurata L.Bolus, accepted as Faucaria subintegra L.Bolus, present
 Faucaria subintegra L.Bolus, endemic
 Faucaria tigrina (Haw.) Schwantes, endemic
 Faucaria tigrina (Haw.) Schwantes forma  splendens H.Jacobsen & G.D.Rowley, accepted as Faucaria tigrina (Haw.) Schwantes, present
 Faucaria tuberculosa (Rolfe) Schwantes, endemic
 Faucaria uniondalensis L.Bolus, accepted as Faucaria felina (L.) Schwantes, present

Fenestraria 
Genus Fenestraria:
 Fenestraria rhopalophylla (Schltr. & Diels) N.E.Br. indigenous
 Fenestraria rhopalophylla (Schltr. & Diels) N.E.Br. subsp. aurantiaca (N.E.Br.) H.E.K.Hartmann, indigenous

Frithia 
Genus Frithia:
 Frithia humilis Burgoyne, endemic
 Frithia pulchra N.E.Br. endemic
 Frithia pulchra N.E.Br. var. minorde Boer, accepted as Frithia humilis Burgoyne, present

Galenia 
Genus Galenia:
 Galenia acutifolia Adamson, endemic
 Galenia affinis Sond. endemic
 Galenia africana L. indigenous
 Galenia africana L. var. pentandra Hiern, accepted as Galenia africana L. present
 Galenia africana L. var. secundata Adamson, accepted as Galenia africana L. present
 Galenia collina (Eckl. & Zeyh.) Walp. endemic
 Galenia crystallina (Eckl. & Zeyh.) Fenzl, indigenous
 Galenia crystallina (Eckl. & Zeyh.) Fenzl var. crystallina, endemic
 Galenia crystallina (Eckl. & Zeyh.) Fenzl var. maritima Adamson, endemic
 Galenia cymosa Adamson, endemic
 Galenia dregeana Fenzl ex Sond. indigenous
 Galenia ecklonis Walp. endemic
 Galenia exigua Adamson, endemic
 Galenia fallax Pax, accepted as Galenia fruticosa (L.f.) Sond.
 Galenia filiformis (Thunb.) N.E.Br. endemic
 Galenia fruticosa (L.f.) Sond. indigenous
 Galenia fruticosa (L.f.) Sond. var. prostrata Adamson, accepted as Galenia fruticosa (L.f.) Sond. present
 Galenia glandulifera Bittrich, endemic
 Galenia hemisphaerica Adamson, indigenous
 Galenia herniariaefolia (C.Presl) Fenzl, endemic
 Galenia hispidissima Fenzl, endemic
 Galenia meziana K.Mull. indigenous
 Galenia namaensis Schinz, indigenous
 Galenia pallens (Eckl. & Zeyh.) Walp. endemic
 Galenia papulosa (Eckl. & Zeyh.) Sond. indigenous
 Galenia portulacacea Fenzl, endemic
 Galenia procumbens L.f. endemic
 Galenia prostrata G.Schellenb. endemic
 Galenia pruinosa Sond. indigenous
 Galenia pubescens (Eckl. & Zeyh.) Druce, endemic
 Galenia pubescens (Eckl. & Zeyh.) Druce var. cerosa Adamson, accepted as Galenia pubescens (Eckl. & Zeyh.) Druce, present
 Galenia pubescens (Eckl. & Zeyh.) Druce var. fourcadei Adamson, accepted as Galenia pubescens (Eckl. & Zeyh.) Druce, present
 Galenia pubescens (Eckl. & Zeyh.) Druce var. lignosa Adamson, accepted as Galenia pubescens (Eckl. & Zeyh.) Druce, present
 Galenia pubescens (Eckl. & Zeyh.) Druce var. pallens Adamson, accepted as Galenia pallens (Eckl. & Zeyh.) Walp. present
 Galenia rigida Adamson, endemic
 Galenia sarcophylla Fenzl, indigenous
 Galenia secunda (L.f.) Sond. indigenous
 Galenia squamulosa (Eckl. & Zeyh.) Fenzl, indigenous
 Galenia subcarnosa Adamson, endemic

Gasoul 
Genus Gasoul:
 Gasoul aitonis (Jacq.) H.Eichler, accepted as Mesembryanthemum aitonis Jacq. indigenous
 Gasoul crystallinum (L.) Rothm. accepted as Mesembryanthemum crystallinum L. indigenous
 Gasoul nodiflorum (L.) Rothm. accepted as Mesembryanthemum nodiflorum L. indigenous

Gibbaeum 
Genus Gibbaeum:
 Gibbaeum album N.E.Br. endemic
 Gibbaeum album N.E.Br. forma roseum (N.E.Br.) G.D.Rowley, accepted as Gibbaeum album N.E.Br. present
 Gibbaeum angulipes (L.Bolus) N.E.Br. endemic
 Gibbaeum austricola Glen, accepted as Gibbaeum hartmannianum Thiede & Niesler, indigenous
 Gibbaeum blackburniae L.Bolus, accepted as Gibbaeum heathii (N.E.Br.) L.Bolus, present
 Gibbaeum comptonii (L.Bolus) L.Bolus, accepted as Gibbaeum heathii (N.E.Br.) L.Bolus, present
 Gibbaeum cryptopodium (Kensit) L.Bolus, accepted as Gibbaeum nuciforme (Haw.) Glen & H.E.K.Hartmann, present
 Gibbaeum dispar N.E.Br. endemic
 Gibbaeum esterhuyseniae L.Bolus, endemic
 Gibbaeum geminum N.E.Br. endemic
 Gibbaeum gibbosum (Haw.) N.E.Br. endemic
 Gibbaeum haagei Schwantes, accepted as Gibbaeum velutinum (L.Bolus) Schwantes, indigenous
 Gibbaeum haagei Schwantes ex H.Jacobsen, accepted as Gibbaeum petrense (N.E.Br.) Tischer, indigenous
 Gibbaeum haagei Schwantes var. parviflorum L.Bolus, accepted as Gibbaeum hartmannianum Thiede & Niesler, indigenous
 Gibbaeum haaglenii H.E.K.Hartmann, accepted as Gibbaeum velutinum (L.Bolus) Schwantes, endemic
 Gibbaeum hartmannianum Thiede & Niesler, endemic
 Gibbaeum heathii (N.E.Br.) L.Bolus, endemic
 Gibbaeum heathii (N.E.Br.) L.Bolus var. elevatum(L.Bolus) L.Bolus, accepted as Gibbaeum heathii (N.E.Br.) L.Bolus, present
 Gibbaeum heathii (N.E.Br.) L.Bolus var. majus(L.Bolus) L.Bolus, accepted as Gibbaeum heathii (N.E.Br.) L.Bolus, present
 Gibbaeum hortenseae (N.E.Br.) Thiede & Klak, endemic
 Gibbaeum johnstonii Van Jaarsv. & S.A.Hammer, accepted as Gibbaeum nebrownii Tischer, present
 Gibbaeum luckhoffii (L.Bolus) L.Bolus, accepted as Gibbaeum heathii (N.E.Br.) L.Bolus, present
 Gibbaeum luteoviride (Haw.) N.E.Br. accepted as Gibbaeum gibbosum (Haw.) N.E.Br. present
 Gibbaeum muirii N.E.Br. accepted as Gibbaeum gibbosum (Haw.) N.E.Br. endemic
 Gibbaeum nebrownii Tischer, endemic
 Gibbaeum nuciforme (Haw.) Glen & H.E.K.Hartmann, endemic
 Gibbaeum pachypodium (Kensit) L.Bolus, endemic
 Gibbaeum petrense (N.E.Br.) Tischer, endemic
 Gibbaeum pilosulum (N.E.Br.) N.E.Br. endemic
 Gibbaeum pubescens (Haw.) N.E.Br. endemic
 Gibbaeum pubescens (Haw.) N.E.Br. subsp. shandii (N.E.Br.) Glen, accepted as Gibbaeum shandii N.E.Br. present
 Gibbaeum schwantesii Tischer, endemic
 Gibbaeum shandii N.E.Br. endemic
 Gibbaeum tischleri H.Wulff, accepted as Gibbaeum petrense (N.E.Br.) Tischer, indigenous
 Gibbaeum velutinum (L.Bolus) Schwantes, endemic

Glottiphyllum 
Genus Glottiphyllum:
 Glottiphyllum angustum (Haw.) N.E.Br. accepted as Glottiphyllum cruciatum (Haw.) N.E.Br. present
 Glottiphyllum apiculatum N.E.Br. accepted as Glottiphyllum cruciatum (Haw.) N.E.Br. present
 Glottiphyllum armoedense Schwantes, accepted as Glottiphyllum cruciatum (Haw.) N.E.Br. present
 Glottiphyllum arrectum N.E.Br. accepted as Glottiphyllum surrectum (Haw.) L.Bolus, present
 Glottiphyllum barrydalense Schwantes, accepted as Glottiphyllum depressum (Haw.) N.E.Br. present
 Glottiphyllum buffelsvleyense Schwantes, accepted as Glottiphyllum depressum (Haw.) N.E.Br. present
 Glottiphyllum carnosum N.E.Br. endemic
 Glottiphyllum cilliersiae Schwantes, accepted as Glottiphyllum linguiforme (L.) N.E.Br. present
 Glottiphyllum compressum L.Bolus, accepted as Glottiphyllum regium N.E.Br. present
 Glottiphyllum concavum N.E.Br. accepted as Glottiphyllum surrectum (Haw.) L.Bolus, present
 Glottiphyllum cruciatum (Haw.) N.E.Br. endemic
 Glottiphyllum davisii L.Bolus, accepted as Glottiphyllum longum (Haw.) N.E.Br. present
 Glottiphyllum depressum (Haw.) N.E.Br. endemic
 Glottiphyllum difforme (L.) N.E.Br. endemic
 Glottiphyllum erectum N.E.Br. accepted as Glottiphyllum longum (Haw.) N.E.Br. present
 Glottiphyllum fergusoniae L.Bolus, endemic
 Glottiphyllum fragrans (Salm-Dyck) Schwantes, accepted as Glottiphyllum depressum (Haw.) N.E.Br. present
 Glottiphyllum framesii L.Bolus, accepted as Glottiphyllum depressum (Haw.) N.E.Br. present
 Glottiphyllum grandiflorum (Haw.) N.E.Br. endemic
 Glottiphyllum haagei Tischer, accepted as Glottiphyllum depressum (Haw.) N.E.Br. present
 Glottiphyllum herrei L.Bolus, accepted as Glottiphyllum suave N.E.Br. present
 Glottiphyllum jacobsenianum Schwantes, accepted as Glottiphyllum depressum (Haw.) N.E.Br. present
 Glottiphyllum jordaanianum Schwantes, accepted as Glottiphyllum carnosum N.E.Br. present
 Glottiphyllum latifolium N.E.Br. accepted as Glottiphyllum linguiforme (L.) N.E.Br. present
 Glottiphyllum latum N.E.Br. accepted as Glottiphyllum longum (Haw.) N.E.Br. present
 Glottiphyllum latum N.E.Br. var. cultratum(Salm-Dyck) N.E.Br. accepted as Glottiphyllum longum (Haw.) N.E.Br. present
 Glottiphyllum linguiforme (L.) N.E.Br. endemic
 Glottiphyllum longipes N.E.Br. accepted as Glottiphyllum cruciatum (Haw.) N.E.Br. present
 Glottiphyllum longum (Haw.) N.E.Br. endemic
 Glottiphyllum longum (Haw.) N.E.Br. var. heterophyllum(Haw.) G.D.Rowley, accepted as Glottiphyllum longum (Haw.) N.E.Br. present
 Glottiphyllum marlothii Schwantes, accepted as Glottiphyllum depressum (Haw.) N.E.Br. present
 Glottiphyllum muirii N.E.Br. accepted as Glottiphyllum depressum (Haw.) N.E.Br. present
 Glottiphyllum neilii N.E.Br. endemic
 Glottiphyllum nelii Schwantes, endemic
 Glottiphyllum nysiae Schwantes, accepted as Glottiphyllum depressum (Haw.) N.E.Br. present
 Glottiphyllum ochraceum (A.Berger) N.E.Br. accepted as Malephora ochracea (A.Berger) H.E.K.Hartmann, present
 Glottiphyllum oligocarpum L.Bolus, endemic
 Glottiphyllum pallens L.Bolus, accepted as Glottiphyllum nelii Schwantes, present
 Glottiphyllum parvifolium L.Bolus, accepted as Glottiphyllum surrectum (Haw.) L.Bolus, present
 Glottiphyllum peersii L.Bolus, endemic
 Glottiphyllum platycarpum L.Bolus, accepted as Glottiphyllum depressum (Haw.) N.E.Br. present
 Glottiphyllum praepingue (Haw.) N.E.Br. accepted as Glottiphyllum cruciatum (Haw.) N.E.Br. present
 Glottiphyllum proclive N.E.Br. accepted as Glottiphyllum depressum (Haw.) N.E.Br. present
 Glottiphyllum propinquum N.E.Br. accepted as Glottiphyllum longum (Haw.) N.E.Br. present
 Glottiphyllum pygmaeum L.Bolus, accepted as Glottiphyllum nelii Schwantes, present
 Glottiphyllum regium N.E.Br. endemic
 Glottiphyllum rosaliae L.Bolus, accepted as Glottiphyllum cruciatum (Haw.) N.E.Br. present
 Glottiphyllum rubrostigma L.Bolus, accepted as Glottiphyllum surrectum (Haw.) L.Bolus, present
 Glottiphyllum rufescens (Haw.) Tischer, accepted as Glottiphyllum depressum (Haw.) N.E.Br. present
 Glottiphyllum ryderae Schwantes, accepted as Glottiphyllum linguiforme (L.) N.E.Br. present
 Glottiphyllum salmii (Haw.) N.E.Br. endemic
 Glottiphyllum semicylindricum (Haw.) N.E.Br. accepted as Glottiphyllum difforme (L.) N.E.Br. present
 Glottiphyllum starkeae L.Bolus, accepted as Glottiphyllum depressum (Haw.) N.E.Br. present
 Glottiphyllum suave N.E.Br. endemic
 Glottiphyllum subditum N.E.Br. accepted as Glottiphyllum difforme (L.) N.E.Br. present
 Glottiphyllum surrectum (Haw.) L.Bolus, endemic
 Glottiphyllum taurinum (Haw.) N.E.Br. accepted as Glottiphyllum depressum (Haw.) N.E.Br. present
 Glottiphyllum uncatum (Salm-Dyck) N.E.Br. accepted as Glottiphyllum longum (Haw.) N.E.Br. present
 Glottiphyllum uniondalense L.Bolus, accepted as Glottiphyllum depressum (Haw.) N.E.Br. present

Halenbergia 
Genus Halenbergia:
 Halenbergia hypertrophica (Dinter) Dinter, accepted as Mesembryanthemum hypertrophicum Dinter, indigenous
 Hallianthus griseus S.A.Hammer & U.Schmiedel, accepted as Cephalophyllum griseum (S.A.Hammer & U.Schmiedel) H.E.K.Hartmann, present
 Hallianthus planus (L.Bolus) H.E.K.Hartmann, endemic

Hammeria 
Genus Hammeria:
 Hammeria cedarbergensis Klak, endemic
 Hammeria gracilis Burgoyne, endemic
 Hammeria meleagris (L.Bolus) Klak, endemic
 Hammeria salteri (L.Bolus) Burgoyne, accepted as Hammeria meleagris (L.Bolus) Klak, present

Hartmanthus 
Genus Hartmanthus:
 Hartmanthus pergamentaceus (L.Bolus) S.A.Hammer, indigenous

Hereroa 
Genus Hereroa:
 Hereroa acuminata L.Bolus, endemic
 Hereroa albanensis L.Bolus, accepted as Rhombophyllum albanense (L.Bolus) H.E.K.Hartmann, present
 Hereroa aspera L.Bolus, endemic
 Hereroa brevifolia L.Bolus, endemic
 Hereroa calycina L.Bolus, endemic
 Hereroa carinans (Haw.) Dinter & Schwantes ex H.Jacobsen, endemic
 Hereroa concava L.Bolus, endemic
 Hereroa crassa L.Bolus, endemic
 Hereroa dyeri L.Bolus, accepted as Rhombophyllum dyeri (L.Bolus) H.E.K.Hartmann, present
 Hereroa fimbriata L.Bolus, endemic
 Hereroa glenensis (N.E.Br.) L.Bolus, endemic
 Hereroa gracilis L.Bolus, endemic
 Hereroa gracilis L.Bolus var. compressa L.Bolus, accepted as Hereroa gracilis L.Bolus, present
 Hereroa granulata (N.E.Br.) Dinter & Schwantes, endemic
 Hereroa herrei Schwantes, endemic
 Hereroa hesperantha (Dinter & A.Berger) Dinter & Schwantes, indigenous
 Hereroa incurva L.Bolus, endemic
 Hereroa joubertii L.Bolus, endemic
 Hereroa latipetala L.Bolus, endemic
 Hereroa muirii L.Bolus, endemic
 Hereroa nelii Schwantes, endemic
 Hereroa odorata (L.Bolus) L.Bolus, endemic
 Hereroa pallens L.Bolus, endemic
 Hereroa rehneltiana (A.Berger) Dinter & Schwantes, endemic
 Hereroa stanfordiae L.Bolus, endemic
 Hereroa stanleyi (L.Bolus) L.Bolus, accepted as Chasmatophyllum stanleyi (L.Bolus) H.E.K.Hartmann, present
 Hereroa stenophylla L.Bolus, endemic
 Hereroa tenuifolia L.Bolus, endemic
 Hereroa teretifolia L.Bolus, endemic
 Hereroa tugwelliae (L.Bolus) L.Bolus, accepted as Bijlia tugwelliae (L.Bolus) S.A.Hammer, present
 Hereroa uncipetala (N.E.Br.) L.Bolus, accepted as Hereroa wilmaniae L.Bolus, present
 Hereroa willowmorensis L.Bolus, endemic
 Hereroa wilmaniae L.Bolus, endemic
 Hereroa wilmaniae L.Bolus var. langebergensis L.Bolus, accepted as Hereroa wilmaniae L.Bolus, present

Herrea 
Genus Herrea:
 Herrea macrocalyx L.Bolus, accepted as Conicosia elongata (Haw.) N.E.Br. present
 Herrea nelii Schwantes, accepted as Conicosia elongata (Haw.) N.E.Br. present

Herreanthus 
Genus Herreanthus:
 Herreanthus meyeri Schwantes, accepted as Conophytum herreanthus S.A.Hammer subsp. herreanthus, present

Hydrodea 
Genus Hydrodea:
 Hydrodea cryptantha (Hook.f.) N.E.Br. accepted as Mesembryanthemum cryptanthum Hook.f. indigenous

Hymenogyne 
Genus Hymenogyne:
 Hymenogyne conica L.Bolus, endemic
 Hymenogyne glabra (Aiton) Haw. endemic

Ihlenfeldtia 
Genus Ihlenfeldtia:
 Ihlenfeldtia excavata (L.Bolus) H.E.K.Hartmann, endemic
 Ihlenfeldtia vanzylii (L.Bolus) H.E.K.Hartmann, endemic

Imitaria 
Genus Imitaria:
 Imitaria muirii N.E.Br. accepted as Gibbaeum nebrownii Tischer, present

Jacobsenia 
Genus Jacobsenia:
 Jacobsenia hallii L.Bolus, endemic
 Jacobsenia kolbei (L.Bolus) L.Bolus & Schwantes, endemic
 Jacobsenia vaginata (L.Bolus) Ihlenf. endemic

Jensenobotrya 
Genus Jensenobotrya:
 Jensenobotrya vanheerdei L.Bolus, accepted as Stoeberia carpii Friedrich, present

Jordaaniella 
Genus Jordaaniella:
 Jordaaniella anemoniflora (L.Bolus) Van Jaarsv. endemic
 Jordaaniella clavifolia (L.Bolus) H.E.K.Hartmann, endemic
 Jordaaniella cuprea (L.Bolus) H.E.K.Hartmann, indigenous
 Jordaaniella dubia (Haw.) H.E.K.Hartmann, endemic
 Jordaaniella maritima (L.Bolus) Van Jaarsv. endemic
 Jordaaniella spongiosa (L.Bolus) H.E.K.Hartmann, endemic
 Jordaaniella uniflora (L.Bolus) H.E.K.Hartmann, endemic

Juttadinteria 
Genus Juttadinteria:
 Juttadinteria albata (L.Bolus) L.Bolus, indigenous
 Juttadinteria attenuata Walgate, indigenous
 Juttadinteria decumbens Schick & Tischer, accepted as Juttadinteria deserticola (Marloth) Schwantes, present
 Juttadinteria deserticola (Marloth) Schwantes, indigenous
 Juttadinteria elizae (Dinter & A.Berger) L.Bolus, accepted as Juttadinteria deserticola (Marloth) Schwantes
 Juttadinteria insolita (L.Bolus) L.Bolus, accepted as Juttadinteria deserticola (Marloth) Schwantes, present
 Juttadinteria kovisimontana (Dinter) Schwantes, accepted as Juttadinteria simpsonii (Dinter) Schwantes
 Juttadinteria longipetala L.Bolus, accepted as Namibia cinerea (Marloth) Dinter & Schwantes
 Juttadinteria sauvissima (Dinter) Schwantes, accepted as Juttadinteria ausensis (L.Bolus) Schwantes
 Juttadinteria tetrasepala L.Bolus, accepted as Juttadinteria deserticola (Marloth) Schwantes, present

Kensitia 
Genus Kensitia:
 Kensitia pillansii (Kensit) Fedde, accepted as Erepsia pillansii (Kensit) Liede, present

Khadia 
Genus Khadia:
 Khadia acutipetala (N.E.Br.) N.E.Br. endemic
 Khadia alticola Chess. & H.E.K.Hartmann, endemic
 Khadia beswickii (L.Bolus) N.E.Br. endemic
 Khadia borealis L.Bolus, endemic
 Khadia carolinensis (L.Bolus) L.Bolus, endemic
 Khadia media P.J.D.Winter & N.Hahn, endemic
 Khadia nationae (N.E.Br.) N.E.Br. accepted as Khadia acutipetala (N.E.Br.) N.E.Br. present
 Khadia nelsoniae N.E.Br. accepted as Khadia beswickii (L.Bolus) N.E.Br. present

Lampranthus 
Genus Lampranthus:
 Lampranthus acrosepalus (L.Bolus) L.Bolus, endemic
 Lampranthus acutifolius (L.Bolus) N.E.Br. endemic
 Lampranthus aduncus (Haw.) N.E.Br. endemic
 Lampranthus aestivus (L.Bolus) L.Bolus, endemic
 Lampranthus affinis L.Bolus, endemic
 Lampranthus algoensis L.Bolus, endemic
 Lampranthus alpinus (L.Bolus) G.D.Rowley, accepted as Esterhuysenia alpina L.Bolus, present
 Lampranthus altistylus N.E.Br. endemic
 Lampranthus amabilis L.Bolus, endemic
 Lampranthus amoenus (Salm-Dyck ex DC.) N.E.Br. endemic
 Lampranthus amphibolius (G.D.Rowley) H.E.K.Hartmann, accepted as Phiambolia hallii (L.Bolus) Klak, present
 Lampranthus antemeridianus (L.Bolus) L.Bolus, endemic
 Lampranthus antonii L.Bolus, endemic
 Lampranthus arbuthnotiae (L.Bolus) L.Bolus, endemic
 Lampranthus arenarius H.E.K.Hartmann, accepted as Ruschiella lunulata (A.Berger) Klak, endemic
 Lampranthus arenicola L.Bolus, accepted as Phiambolia persistens (L.Bolus) Klak, present
 Lampranthus arenosus (L.Bolus) L.Bolus, accepted as Lampranthus lavisii (L.Bolus) L.Bolus, endemic
 Lampranthus argenteus (L.Bolus) L.Bolus, accepted as Ruschiella argentea (L.Bolus) Klak, endemic
 Lampranthus argillosus L.Bolus, endemic
 Lampranthus aurantiacus (DC.) Schwantes, accepted as Lampranthus glaucoides (Haw.) N.E.Br. present
 Lampranthus aureus (L.) N.E.Br. endemic
 Lampranthus austricola (L.Bolus) L.Bolus, endemic
 Lampranthus baylissii L.Bolus, accepted as Lampranthus fergusoniae (L.Bolus) L.Bolus, endemic
 Lampranthus berghiae (L.Bolus) L.Bolus, endemic
 Lampranthus bicolor (L.) N.E.Br., endemic
 Lampranthus bicolor (L.) N.E.Br. var. inaequale(Haw.) Schwantes, accepted as Lampranthus inaequalis (Haw.) N.E.Br. present
 Lampranthus blandus (Haw.) Schwantes, accepted as Lampranthus multiradiatus (Jacq.) N.E.Br. endemic
 Lampranthus borealis L.Bolus, indigenous
 Lampranthus brachyandrus (L.Bolus) N.E.Br. indigenous
 Lampranthus brevistaminus (L.Bolus) L.Bolus, endemic
 Lampranthus brownii (Hook.f.) N.E.Br. endemic
 Lampranthus caespitosus (L.Bolus) N.E.Br. endemic
 Lampranthus caespitosus (L.Bolus) N.E.Br. var. luxurians(L.Bolus) H.Jacobsen, accepted as Lampranthus debilis (Haw.) N.E.Br. present
 Lampranthus calcaratus (Wolley-Dod) N.E.Br. endemic
 Lampranthus candidus L.Bolus, accepted as Lampranthus falcatus (L.) N.E.Br. endemic
 Lampranthus capillaceus (L.Bolus) N.E.Br. accepted as Lampranthus falcatus (L.) N.E.Br. endemic
 Lampranthus caudatus L.Bolus, endemic
 Lampranthus cedarbergensis (L.Bolus) L.Bolus, accepted as Oscularia cedarbergensis (L.Bolus) H.E.K.Hartmann, present
 Lampranthus ceriseus (L.Bolus) L.Bolus, endemic
 Lampranthus citrinus (L.Bolus) L.Bolus, accepted as Lampranthus glaucus (L.) N.E.Br. endemic
 Lampranthus coccineus (Haw.) N.E.Br. endemic
 Lampranthus compressus L.Bolus, accepted as Oscularia compressa (L.Bolus) H.E.K.Hartmann, present
 Lampranthus comptonii (L.Bolus) N.E.Br. var. angustifolius(L.Bolus) L.Bolus, accepted as Oscularia comptonii (L.Bolus) H.E.K.Hartmann, present
 Lampranthus comptonii (L.Bolus) N.E.Br. var. angustifolius forma roseus, accepted as Oscularia comptonii (L.Bolus) H.E.K.Hartmann, present
 Lampranthus comptonii (L.Bolus) N.E.Br. var. comptonii, accepted as Oscularia comptonii (L.Bolus) H.E.K.Hartmann, present
 Lampranthus conspicuus (Haw.) N.E.Br. endemic
 Lampranthus convexus (L.Bolus) L.Bolus, accepted as Ruschiella lunulata (A.Berger) Klak, endemic
 Lampranthus copiosus (L.Bolus) L.Bolus, accepted as Oscularia copiosa (L.Bolus) H.E.K.Hartmann, present
 Lampranthus coralliflorus (Salm-Dyck) Schwantes, endemic
 Lampranthus creber L.Bolus, endemic
 Lampranthus curviflorus (Haw.) H.E.K.Hartmann, endemic
 Lampranthus curviflorus (Haw.) N.E.Br. ex H.Jacobsen, accepted as Lampranthus curviflorus (Haw.) H.E.K.Hartmann, present
 Lampranthus curvifolius (Haw.) N.E.Br., endemic
 Lampranthus curvifolius (Haw.) N.E.Br. var. minor(Salm-Dyck) G.D.Rowley, accepted as Lampranthus flexifolius (Haw.) N.E.Br. present
 Lampranthus cyathiformis (L.Bolus) N.E.Br. endemic
 Lampranthus debilis (Haw.) N.E.Br. endemic
 Lampranthus deflexus (Aiton) N.E.Br. endemic
 Lampranthus deltoides (L.) Glen, accepted as Oscularia deltoides (L.) Schwantes, present
 Lampranthus densifolius (L.Bolus) L.Bolus, endemic
 Lampranthus densipetalus (L.Bolus) L.Bolus, endemic
 Lampranthus dependens (L.Bolus) L.Bolus, endemic
 Lampranthus diffusus (L.Bolus) N.E.Br. endemic
 Lampranthus dilutus N.E.Br. endemic
 Lampranthus disgregus (N.E.Br.) N.E.Br. endemic
 Lampranthus dissimilis (G.D.Rowley) H.E.K.Hartmann, accepted as Phiambolia littlewoodii (L.Bolus) Klak, present
 Lampranthus diutinus (L.Bolus) N.E.Br. endemic
 Lampranthus dregeanus (Sond.) N.E.Br. endemic
 Lampranthus dubitans (L.Bolus) L.Bolus, accepted as Phiambolia unca (L.Bolus) Klak, endemic
 Lampranthus dulcis (L.Bolus) L.Bolus, endemic
 Lampranthus dunensis (Sond.) L.Bolus, accepted as Erepsia dunensis (Sond.) Klak, present
 Lampranthus dyckii (A.Berger) N.E.Br. endemic
 Lampranthus ebracteatus L.Bolus, accepted as Oscularia comptonii (L.Bolus) H.E.K.Hartmann, endemic
 Lampranthus edwardsiae (L.Bolus) L.Bolus, accepted as Ruschiella lunulata (A.Berger) Klak, endemic
 Lampranthus egregius (L.Bolus) L.Bolus, endemic
 Lampranthus elegans (Jacq.) Schwantes, endemic
 Lampranthus emarginatoides (Haw.) N.E.Br. endemic
 Lampranthus emarginatus (L.) N.E.Br. endemic
 Lampranthus emarginatus (L.) N.E.Br. var. puniceus(Jacq.) Schwantes, accepted as Lampranthus emarginatus (L.) N.E.Br. present
 Lampranthus ernestii (L.Bolus) L.Bolus, endemic
 Lampranthus erratus (Salm-Dyck) N.E.Br. accepted as Ruschia knysnana (L.Bolus) L.Bolus, present
 Lampranthus esterhuyseniae L.Bolus, endemic
 Lampranthus excedens (L.Bolus) L.Bolus, accepted as Oscularia excedens (L.Bolus) H.E.K.Hartmann, present
 Lampranthus eximius L.Bolus, endemic
 Lampranthus explanatus (L.Bolus) N.E.Br. endemic
 Lampranthus falcatus (L.) N.E.Br. endemic
 Lampranthus falcatus (L.) N.E.Br. var. galpinii(L.Bolus) L.Bolus, accepted as Lampranthus vallis-gratiae (Schltr. & A.Berger) N.E.Br. present
 Lampranthus falciformis (Haw.) N.E.Br. endemic
 Lampranthus falciformis (Haw.) N.E.Br. var. maritimus(L.Bolus) L.Bolus, accepted as Jordaaniella maritima (L.Bolus) Van Jaarsv. present
 Lampranthus fergusoniae (L.Bolus) L.Bolus, endemic
 Lampranthus fergusoniae (L.Bolus) L.Bolus var. crassistigmaL.Bolus, accepted as Lampranthus fergusoniae (L.Bolus) L.Bolus, present
 Lampranthus filicaulis (Haw.) N.E.Br. endemic
 Lampranthus flexifolius (Haw.) N.E.Br. endemic
 Lampranthus flexilis (Haw.) N.E.Br. endemic
 Lampranthus foliosus L.Bolus, endemic
 Lampranthus formosus (Haw.) N.E.Br. endemic
 Lampranthus framesii (L.Bolus) N.E.Br. endemic
 Lampranthus francesiae H.E.K.Hartmann, accepted as Phiambolia unca (L.Bolus) Klak, present
 Lampranthus franciscii L.Bolus, accepted as Phiambolia franciscii (L.Bolus) Klak, present
 Lampranthus fugitans L.Bolus, endemic
 Lampranthus furvus (L.Bolus) N.E.Br. endemic
 Lampranthus galpiniae (L.Bolus) L.Bolus, endemic
 Lampranthus glaucoides (Haw.) N.E.Br. endemic
 Lampranthus glaucus (L.) N.E.Br. endemic
 Lampranthus glaucus (L.) N.E.Br. var. tortuosus(Salm-Dyck) Schwantes, accepted as Lampranthus glaucus (L.) N.E.Br. indigenous
 Lampranthus globosus (L.Bolus) L.Bolus, endemic
 Lampranthus glomeratus (L.) N.E.Br. endemic
 Lampranthus godmaniae (L.Bolus) L.Bolus, endemic
 Lampranthus godmaniae (L.Bolus) L.Bolus var. grandiflorus(L.Bolus) L.Bolus, accepted as Lampranthus haworthii (Haw.) N.E.Br. present
 Lampranthus gracilipes (L.Bolus) N.E.Br. endemic
 Lampranthus gracilipes (L.Bolus) N.E.Br. forma luxurians L.Bolus, accepted as Lampranthus gracilipes (L.Bolus) N.E.Br. present
 Lampranthus guthrieae (L.Bolus) N.E.Br. accepted as Oscularia guthriae (L.Bolus) H.E.K.Hartmann, present
 Lampranthus gydouwensis L.Bolus, accepted as Phiambolia incumbens (L.Bolus) Klak, present
 Lampranthus hallii L.Bolus, endemic
 Lampranthus haworthii (Haw.) N.E.Br. endemic
 Lampranthus henricii (L.Bolus) N.E.Br. accepted as Ruschiella henricii (L.Bolus) Klak, endemic
 Lampranthus hiemalis (L.Bolus) L.Bolus, accepted as Ruschiella lunulata (A.Berger) Klak, endemic
 Lampranthus hoerleinianus (Dinter) Friedrich, indigenous
 Lampranthus holensis L.Bolus, endemic
 Lampranthus hollandii (L.Bolus) L.Bolus, endemic
 Lampranthus hurlingii (L.Bolus) L.Bolus, endemic
 Lampranthus imbricans (Haw.) N.E.Br. endemic
 Lampranthus immelmaniae (L.Bolus) N.E.Br. endemic
 Lampranthus inaequalis (Haw.) N.E.Br. endemic
 Lampranthus inconspicuus (Haw.) Schwantes, endemic
 Lampranthus incurvus (Haw.) Schwantes, endemic
 Lampranthus intervallaris L.Bolus, endemic
 Lampranthus laetus (L.Bolus) L.Bolus, endemic
 Lampranthus lavisii (L.Bolus) L.Bolus, endemic
 Lampranthus lavisii (L.Bolus) L.Bolus var. concinnus L.Bolus, accepted as Lampranthus lavisii (L.Bolus) L.Bolus, indigenous
 Lampranthus laxifolius (L.Bolus) N.E.Br. endemic
 Lampranthus leightoniae (L.Bolus) L.Bolus, endemic
 Lampranthus leipoldtii (L.Bolus) L.Bolus, endemic
 Lampranthus leptaleon (Haw.) N.E.Br. endemic
 Lampranthus leptosepalus (L.Bolus) L.Bolus, endemic
 Lampranthus lewisiae (L.Bolus) L.Bolus, endemic
 Lampranthus liberalis (L.Bolus) L.Bolus, endemic
 Lampranthus littlewoodii L.Bolus, accepted as Lampranthus esterhuyseniae L.Bolus, endemic
 Lampranthus longisepalus L.Bolus, accepted as Hammeria meleagris (L.Bolus) Klak, present
 Lampranthus longistamineus (L.Bolus) N.E.Br. accepted as Lampranthus glaucus (L.) N.E.Br. endemic
 Lampranthus lunatus (Willd.) N.E.Br. accepted as Oscularia lunata (Willd.) H.E.K.Hartmann, present
 Lampranthus lunulatus (A.Berger) L.Bolus, accepted as Ruschiella lunulata (A.Berger) Klak, endemic
 Lampranthus macrocarpus (A.Berger) N.E.Br. endemic
 Lampranthus macrosepalus (L.Bolus) L.Bolus, endemic
 Lampranthus macrostigma L.Bolus, endemic
 Lampranthus magnificus (L.Bolus) N.E.Br. endemic
 Lampranthus marcidulus N.E.Br. endemic
 Lampranthus marginatus (L.Bolus) H.E.K.Hartmann, accepted as Phiambolia unca (L.Bolus) Klak, present
 Lampranthus mariae (L.Bolus) L.Bolus, accepted as Ruschiella henricii (L.Bolus) Klak, endemic
 Lampranthus martleyi (L.Bolus) L.Bolus, endemic
 Lampranthus maturus N.E.Br. endemic
 Lampranthus matutinus (L.Bolus) N.E.Br., endemic
 Lampranthus maximilianii (Schltr. & A.Berger) L.Bolus, accepted as Braunsia maximilianii (Schltr. & A.Berger) Schwantes, present
 Lampranthus meleagris (L.Bolus) L.Bolus, accepted as Hammeria meleagris (L.Bolus) Klak, present
 Lampranthus microsepalus L.Bolus, endemic
 Lampranthus microstigma (L.Bolus) N.E.Br. endemic
 Lampranthus middlemostii (L.Bolus) L.Bolus, endemic
 Lampranthus montaguensis (L.Bolus) L.Bolus, accepted as Ruschiella argentea (L.Bolus) Klak, endemic
 Lampranthus mucronatus L.Bolus, endemic
 Lampranthus multiradiatus (Jacq.) N.E.Br. endemic
 Lampranthus multiseriatus (L.Bolus) N.E.Br. endemic
 Lampranthus mutans (L.Bolus) N.E.Br. endemic
 Lampranthus mutatus (G.D.Rowley) H.E.K.Hartmann, accepted as Ruschia mutata G.D.Rowley, endemic
 Lampranthus nardouwensis (L.Bolus) L.Bolus, accepted as Ruschiella argentea (L.Bolus) Klak, endemic
 Lampranthus nelii L.Bolus, endemic
 Lampranthus neostayneri L.Bolus, endemic
 Lampranthus obconicus (L.Bolus) L.Bolus, endemic
 Lampranthus occultans L.Bolus, endemic
 Lampranthus ornatus L.Bolus, accepted as Oscularia ornata (L.Bolus) H.E.K.Hartmann, present
 Lampranthus otzenianus (Dinter) Friedrich, indigenous
 Lampranthus paardebergensis (L.Bolus) L.Bolus, accepted as Oscularia paardebergensis (L.Bolus) H.E.K.Hartmann, present
 Lampranthus paarlensis L.Bolus, endemic
 Lampranthus pakhuisensis (L.Bolus) L.Bolus, endemic
 Lampranthus pakpassensis H.E.K.Hartmann, accepted as Ruschiella lunulata (A.Berger) Klak, endemic
 Lampranthus palustris (L.Bolus) L.Bolus, accepted as Lampranthus glaucus (L.) N.E.Br. endemic
 Lampranthus parcus N.E.Br. endemic
 Lampranthus pauciflorus (L.Bolus) N.E.Br. endemic
 Lampranthus paucifolius (L.Bolus) N.E.Br. endemic
 Lampranthus peacockiae (L.Bolus) L.Bolus, endemic
 Lampranthus peersii (L.Bolus) N.E.Br. endemic
 Lampranthus perreptans L.Bolus, endemic
 Lampranthus persistens (L.Bolus) L.Bolus, accepted as Phiambolia persistens (L.Bolus) Klak, present
 Lampranthus piquetbergensis (L.Bolus) L.Bolus, accepted as Oscularia piquetbergensis (L.Bolus) H.E.K.Hartmann, present
 Lampranthus plautus N.E.Br. accepted as Lampranthus densipetalus (L.Bolus) L.Bolus, endemic
 Lampranthus pleniflorus L.Bolus, accepted as Ruschiella lunulata (A.Berger) Klak, endemic
 Lampranthus plenus (L.Bolus) L.Bolus, endemic
 Lampranthus pocockiae (L.Bolus) N.E.Br. endemic
 Lampranthus polyanthon (Haw.) N.E.Br. endemic
 Lampranthus praecipitatus (L.Bolus) L.Bolus, endemic
 Lampranthus prasinus L.Bolus, accepted as Oscularia prasina (L.Bolus) H.E.K.Hartmann, present
 Lampranthus primivernus (L.Bolus) L.Bolus, accepted as Oscularia primiverna (L.Bolus) H.E.K.Hartmann, present
 Lampranthus procumbens Klak, endemic
 Lampranthus productus (Haw.) N.E.Br. endemic
 Lampranthus productus (Haw.) N.E.Br. var. lepidus(Haw.) Schwantes, accepted as Lampranthus productus (Haw.) N.E.Br. present
 Lampranthus productus (Haw.) N.E.Br. var. purpureus(L.Bolus) L.Bolus, accepted as Lampranthus productus (Haw.) N.E.Br. present
 Lampranthus profundus (L.Bolus) H.E.K.Hartmann, endemic
 Lampranthus prominulus (L.Bolus) L.Bolus, endemic
 Lampranthus promontorii (L.Bolus) N.E.Br. endemic
 Lampranthus proximus L.Bolus, endemic
 Lampranthus purpureus L.Bolus, endemic
 Lampranthus rabiesbergensis (L.Bolus) L.Bolus, endemic
 Lampranthus recurvus (L.Bolus) Schwantes, endemic
 Lampranthus reptans (Aiton) N.E.Br. endemic
 Lampranthus roseus (Willd.) Schwantes, endemic
 Lampranthus rubroluteus (L.Bolus) L.Bolus, endemic
 Lampranthus rupestris (L.Bolus) N.E.Br. endemic
 Lampranthus rustii (A.Berger) N.E.Br. endemic
 Lampranthus salicola (L.Bolus) L.Bolus, endemic
 Lampranthus salteri (L.Bolus) L.Bolus, endemic
 Lampranthus saturatus (L.Bolus) N.E.Br. endemic
 Lampranthus sauerae (L.Bolus) L.Bolus, endemic
 Lampranthus scaber (L.) N.E.Br. endemic
 Lampranthus schlechteri (Zahlbr.) L.Bolus, endemic
 Lampranthus serpens (L.Bolus) L.Bolus, accepted as Lampranthus reptans (Aiton) N.E.Br. endemic
 Lampranthus simulans L.Bolus, accepted as Erepsia simulans (L.Bolus) Klak, present
 Lampranthus sociorum (L.Bolus) N.E.Br. endemic
 Lampranthus sparsiflorus L.Bolus, endemic
 Lampranthus spectabilis (Haw.) N.E.Br. endemic
 Lampranthus spiniformis (Haw.) N.E.Br. endemic
 Lampranthus staminodiosus (L.Bolus) Schwantes, endemic
 Lampranthus stanfordiae L.Bolus, endemic
 Lampranthus stayneri (L.Bolus) N.E.Br. endemic
 Lampranthus steenbergensis (L.Bolus) L.Bolus, accepted as Oscularia steenbergensis (L.Bolus) H.E.K.Hartmann, present
 Lampranthus stenopetalus (L.Bolus) N.E.Br. endemic
 Lampranthus stenus (Haw.) N.E.Br. endemic
 Lampranthus stephanii (Schwantes) Schwantes, endemic
 Lampranthus sternens L.Bolus, endemic
 Lampranthus stipulaceus (L.) N.E.Br. endemic
 Lampranthus stoloniferus L.Bolus, accepted as Hammeria meleagris (L.Bolus) Klak, present
 Lampranthus suavissimus (L.Bolus) L.Bolus, indigenous
 Lampranthus suavissimus (L.Bolus) L.Bolus var. oculatus(L.Bolus) L.Bolus, accepted as Lampranthus suavissimus (L.Bolus) L.Bolus, present
 Lampranthus suavissimus (L.Bolus) L.Bolus var. suavissimus forma fera, accepted as Lampranthus suavissimus (L.Bolus) L.Bolus, present
 Lampranthus subaequalis (L.Bolus) L.Bolus, endemic
 Lampranthus sublaxus (L.Bolus) L.Bolus, endemic
 Lampranthus subrotundus L.Bolus, endemic
 Lampranthus subtruncatus L.Bolus, endemic
 Lampranthus subtruncatus L.Bolus var. wupperthalensis L.Bolus, accepted as Lampranthus subtruncatus L.Bolus, present
 Lampranthus superans (L.Bolus) L.Bolus, accepted as Oscularia superans (L.Bolus) H.E.K.Hartmann, present
 Lampranthus swartbergensis (L.Bolus) N.E.Br. endemic
 Lampranthus swartkopensis Strohschn. endemic
 Lampranthus tegens (F.Muell.) N.E.Br. endemic
 Lampranthus tenuifolius (L.) N.E.Br. endemic
 Lampranthus tenuis L.Bolus, endemic
 Lampranthus thermarum (L.Bolus) L.Bolus, accepted as Oscularia thermarum (L.Bolus) H.E.K.Hartmann, present
 Lampranthus tulbaghensis (A.Berger) N.E.Br. endemic
 Lampranthus turbinatus (Jacq.) N.E.Br. endemic
 Lampranthus uncus (L.Bolus) Schwantes, accepted as Phiambolia unca (L.Bolus) Klak, present
 Lampranthus uniflorus (L.Bolus) L.Bolus, endemic
 Lampranthus vallis-gratiae (Schltr. & A.Berger) N.E.Br. endemic
 Lampranthus vanheerdei L.Bolus, accepted as Lampranthus esterhuyseniae L.Bolus, endemic
 Lampranthus vanputtenii (L.Bolus) N.E.Br. endemic
 Lampranthus vanzijliae (L.Bolus) N.E.Br. endemic
 Lampranthus variabilis (Haw.) N.E.Br. endemic
 Lampranthus verecundus (L.Bolus) N.E.Br. endemic
 Lampranthus vernalis (L.Bolus) L.Bolus, endemic
 Lampranthus vernicolor (L.Bolus) L.Bolus, accepted as Oscularia vernicolor (L.Bolus) H.E.K.Hartmann, present
 Lampranthus viatorum (L.Bolus) N.E.Br. accepted as Antimima viatorum (L.Bolus) Klak, present
 Lampranthus villiersii (L.Bolus) L.Bolus, endemic
 Lampranthus violaceus (DC.) Schwantes in H.Jacobsen, endemic
 Lampranthus virgatus L.Bolus, endemic
 Lampranthus vredenburgensis L.Bolus, accepted as Oscularia vredenburgensis (L.Bolus) H.E.K.Hartmann, present
 Lampranthus walgateae L.Bolus, endemic
 Lampranthus watermeyeri (L.Bolus) N.E.Br. endemic
 Lampranthus woodburniae (L.Bolus) N.E.Br. accepted as Lampranthus reptans (Aiton) N.E.Br. endemic
 Lampranthus wordsworthiae (L.Bolus) N.E.Br. endemic
 Lampranthus zeyheri (Salm-Dyck) N.E.Br. endemic

Lapidaria 
Genus Lapidaria:
 Lapidaria margaretae (Schwantes) Dinter & Schwantes, indigenous

Leipoldtia 
Genus Leipoldtia:
 Leipoldtia alborosea (L.Bolus) H.E.K.Hartmann & Stuber, indigenous
 Leipoldtia amplexicaulis (L.Bolus) L.Bolus forma  amplexicaulis, accepted as Leipoldtia schultzei (Schltr. & Diels) Friedrich, present
 Leipoldtia amplexicaulis (L.Bolus) L.Bolus forma fera L.Bolus, accepted as Leipoldtia schultzei (Schltr. & Diels) Friedrich, present
 Leipoldtia aprica (A.Berger) L.Bolus, accepted as Leipoldtia schultzei (Schltr. & Diels) Friedrich, present
 Leipoldtia brevifolia L.Bolus, accepted as Leipoldtia schultzei (Schltr. & Diels) Friedrich, present
 Leipoldtia britteniae (L.Bolus) L.Bolus, accepted as Leipoldtia schultzei (Schltr. & Diels) Friedrich, present
 Leipoldtia calandra (L.Bolus) L.Bolus, endemic
 Leipoldtia compacta L.Bolus, endemic
 Leipoldtia constricta (L.Bolus) L.Bolus, accepted as Leipoldtia schultzei (Schltr. & Diels) Friedrich, present
 Leipoldtia framesii L.Bolus, accepted as Leipoldtia laxa L.Bolus, present
 Leipoldtia frutescens (L.Bolus) H.E.K.Hartmann, indigenous
 Leipoldtia gigantea Klak, endemic
 Leipoldtia grandifolia L.Bolus, accepted as Leipoldtia weigangiana (Dinter) Dinter & Schwantes subsp. grandifolia (L.Bolus) H.E.K.Hartmann & S.R, present
 Leipoldtia herrei (Schwantes) Schwantes, accepted as Leipoldtia schultzei (Schltr. & Diels) Friedrich, present
 Leipoldtia jacobseniana Schwantes, accepted as Leipoldtia schultzei (Schltr. & Diels) Friedrich, present
 Leipoldtia klaverensis L.Bolus, endemic
 Leipoldtia laxa L.Bolus, endemic
 Leipoldtia littlewoodii L.Bolus, accepted as Leipoldtia weigangiana (Dinter) Dinter & Schwantes subsp. littlewoodii (L.Bolus) H.E.K.Hartmann & S.
 Leipoldtia lunata H.E.K.Hartmann & S.Rust, endemic
 Leipoldtia nelii L.Bolus, accepted as Leipoldtia schultzei (Schltr. & Diels) Friedrich, present
 Leipoldtia nevillei Klak, endemic
 Leipoldtia pauciflora L.Bolus, accepted as Leipoldtia schultzei (Schltr. & Diels) Friedrich, present
 Leipoldtia rosea L.Bolus, endemic
 Leipoldtia schultzei (Schltr. & Diels) Friedrich, endemic
 Leipoldtia uniflora L.Bolus, endemic
 Leipoldtia weigangiana (Dinter) Dinter & Schwantes, indigenous
 Leipoldtia weigangiana (Dinter) Dinter & Schwantes subsp. grandifolia (L.Bolus) H.E.K.Hartmann & S.R, indigenous
 Leipoldtia weigangiana (Dinter) Dinter & Schwantes subsp. littlewoodii (L.Bolus) H.E.K.Hartmann & S. indigenous
 Leipoldtia weigangiana (Dinter) Dinter & Schwantes subsp. weigangiana, indigenous

Lithops 
Genus Lithops:
 Lithops alpina Dinter, accepted as Lithops pseudotruncatella (A.Berger) N.E.Br. subsp. pseudotruncatella 
 Lithops annae de Boer, accepted as Lithops gesineae de Boer
 Lithops archerae de Boer, accepted as Lithops pseudotruncatella (A.Berger) N.E.Br. subsp. archerae (de Boer) D.T.Cole
 Lithops aucampiae L.Bolus, indigenous
 Lithops aucampiae L.Bolus subsp. aucampiae endemic
 Lithops aucampiae L.Bolus subsp. aucampiae var. koelemanii, accepted as Lithops aucampiae L.Bolus subsp. aucampiae pres
 Lithops aucampiae L.Bolus subsp. euniceae (de Boer) D.T.Cole, endemic
 Lithops aucampiae L.Bolus subsp. euniceae (de Boer) D.T.Cole var. fluminalis, accepted as Lithops aucampiae L.Bolus subsp. euniceae (de Boer) D.T.Cole, present
 Lithops aucampiae L.Bolus var. euniceae de Boer, accepted as Lithops aucampiae L.Bolus subsp. euniceae (de Boer) D.T.Cole, present
 Lithops aucampiae L.Bolus var. fluminalis D.T.Cole, accepted as Lithops aucampiae L.Bolus subsp. euniceae (de Boer) D.T.Cole, present
 Lithops aurantiaca L.Bolus, accepted as Lithops hookeri (A.Berger) Schwantes, present
 Lithops bella N.E.Br. var. bella, accepted as Lithops karasmontana (Dinter & Schwantes) N.E.Br. subsp. bella (N.E.Br.) D.T.Cole
 Lithops bella N.E.Br. var. eberlanzii (Dinter & Schwantes) de Boer & Boom, accepted as Lithops karasmontana (Dinter & Schwantes) N.E.Br. subsp. eberlanzii (Dinter & Schwantes) D.T.Cole
 Lithops bella N.E.Br. var. lericheana (Dinter & Schwantes) de Boer & Boom, accepted as Lithops karasmontana (Dinter & Schwantes) N.E.Br. subsp. karasmontana Lithops brevis L.Bolus, accepted as Lithops dinteri Schwantes subsp. dinteri pres
 Lithops bromfieldii L.Bolus, endemic
 Lithops bromfieldii L.Bolus var. glaudinae (de Boer) D.T.Cole, accepted as Lithops bromfieldii L.Bolus, present
 Lithops bromfieldii L.Bolus var. insularis (L.Bolus) B.Fearn, accepted as Lithops bromfieldii L.Bolus, present
 Lithops bromfieldii] L.Bolus var. mennellii (L.Bolus) B.Fearn, accepted as Lithops bromfieldii L.Bolus, present
 Lithops christinae de Boer, accepted as Lithops schwantesii Dinter subsp. schwantesii pres
 Lithops chrysocephala Nel, accepted as Lithops julii (Dinter & Schwantes) N.E.Br. subsp. julii pres
 Lithops coleorum S.A.Hammer & Uijs, endemic
 Lithops comptonii L.Bolus, endemic
 Lithops comptonii L.Bolus var. divergens (L.Bolus) B.Fearn, accepted as Lithops divergens L.Bolus, present
 Lithops comptonii L.Bolus var. divergens (L.Bolus) B.Fearn forma amethystina, accepted as Lithops divergens L.Bolus, present
 Lithops comptonii L.Bolus var. viridis (H.A.Luckh.) B.Fearn, accepted as Lithops viridis H.A.Luckh. present
 Lithops comptonii L.Bolus var. weberi (Nel) D.T.Cole, accepted as Lithops comptonii L.Bolus, present
 Lithops dabneri L.Bolus, accepted as Lithops hookeri (A.Berger) Schwantes, present
 Lithops damarana (N.E.Br.) N.E.Br. accepted as Lithops karasmontana (Dinter & Schwantes) N.E.Br. subsp. karasmontana 
 Lithops deboeri Schwantes, accepted as Lithops villetii L.Bolus subsp. deboeri (Schwantes) D.T.Cole, present
 Lithops dendritica Nel, accepted as Lithops pseudotruncatella (A.Berger) N.E.Br. subsp. dendritica (Nel) D.T.Cole
 Lithops dinteri Schwantes, indigenous
 Lithops dinteri Schwantes subsp. dinteri var. brevis, accepted as Lithops dinteri Schwantes subsp. dinteri, present
 Lithops dinteri Schwantes subsp. frederici (D.T.Cole) D.T.Cole, endemic
 Lithops dinteri Schwantes var. frederici D.T.Cole, accepted as Lithops dinteri Schwantes subsp. frederici (D.T.Cole) D.T.Cole, present
 Lithops dinteri Schwantes var. marthae(Loesch & Tischer) B.Fearn, accepted as Lithops schwantesii Dinter subsp. schwantesii 
 Lithops dinteri Schwantes var. multipunctata de Boer, accepted as Lithops dinteri Schwantes subsp. multipunctata (de Boer) D.T.Cole
 Lithops diutina L.Bolus, accepted as Lithops marmorata (N.E.Br.) N.E.Br. present
 Lithops divergens L.Bolus, endemic
 Lithops divergens L.Bolus var. amethystina de Boer, accepted as Lithops divergens L.Bolus
 Lithops dorotheae Nel, endemic
 Lithops eberlanzii (Dinter & Schwantes) N.E.Br. accepted as Lithops karasmontana (Dinter & Schwantes) N.E.Br. subsp. eberlanzii (Dinter & Schwantes) D.T.Cole
 Lithops edithiae N.E.Br. accepted as Lithops karasmontana (Dinter & Schwantes) N.E.Br. subsp. eberlanzii (Dinter & Schwantes) D.T.Cole
 Lithops eksteeniae L.Bolus, accepted as Lithops dorotheae Nel, present
 Lithops elevata L.Bolus, accepted as Lithops optica (Marloth) N.E.Br.
 Lithops elisabethiae Dinter, accepted as Lithops pseudotruncatella (A.Berger) N.E.Br. subsp. pseudotruncatella * Lithops elisae de Boer, accepted as Lithops marmorata (N.E.Br.) N.E.Br. present
 Lithops erniana Tischer ex H.Jacobsen, accepted as Lithops karasmontana (Dinter & Schwantes) N.E.Br. subsp. eberlanzii (Dinter & Schwantes) D.T.Cole
 Lithops erniana Tischer ex H.Jacobsen var. aiaisensisde Boer, accepted as Lithops karasmontana (Dinter & Schwantes) N.E.Br. subsp. karasmontana pres
 Lithops erniana Tischer ex H.Jacobsen var. witputzensis de Boer, accepted as Lithops karasmontana (Dinter & Schwantes) N.E.Br. subsp. eberlanzii (Dinter & Schwantes) D.T.Cole
 Lithops framesii L.Bolus, accepted as Lithops marmorata (N.E.Br.) N.E.Br. present
 Lithops fulleri N.E.Br. var. brunneade Boer, accepted as Lithops julii (Dinter & Schwantes) N.E.Br. subsp. fulleri (N.E.Br.) B.Fearn, present
 Lithops fulleri N.E.Br. var. chrysocephala(Nel) de Boer, accepted as Lithops julii (Dinter & Schwantes) N.E.Br. subsp. julii present
 Lithops fulleri N.E.Br. var. fulleri, accepted as Lithops julii (Dinter & Schwantes) N.E.Br. subsp. fulleri (N.E.Br.) B.Fearn, present
 Lithops fulleri N.E.Br. var. kennedyi de Boer, accepted as Lithops villetii L.Bolus subsp. kennedyi (de Boer) D.T.Cole, present
 Lithops fulleri N.E.Br. var. ochracea de Boer, accepted as Lithops hallii de Boer, present
 Lithops fulleri N.E.Br. var. rouxii (de Boer) D.T.Cole, accepted as Lithops julii (Dinter & Schwantes) N.E.Br. subsp. fulleri (N.E.Br.) B.Fearn, present
 Lithops fulleri N.E.Br. var. tapscottii L.Bolus, accepted as Lithops julii (Dinter & Schwantes) N.E.Br. subsp. fulleri (N.E.Br.) B.Fearn, present
 Lithops fulviceps (N.E.Br.) N.E.Br. indigenous
 Lithops fulviceps (N.E.Br.) N.E.Br. var. lactinea D.T.Cole, accepted as Lithops fulviceps (N.E.Br.) N.E.Br.
 Lithops fulviceps N.E.Br. var. fulviceps, indigenous
 Lithops fulviceps N.E.Br. var. laevigata D.T.Cole, endemic
 Lithops gesineae de Boer var. annae (de Boer) D.T.Cole, accepted as Lithops gesineae de Boer
 Lithops geyeri Nel, endemic
 Lithops glaudinae de Boer, accepted as Lithops bromfieldii L.Bolus, present
 Lithops gracilidelineata Dinter, indigenous
 Lithops gracilidelineata Dinter subsp. gracilidelineata var. waldroniae, accepted as Lithops gracilidelineata Dinter subsp. gracilidelineata 
 Lithops gulielmi L.Bolus, accepted as Lithops schwantesii Dinter subsp. schwantesii 
 Lithops hallii de Boer, endemic
 Lithops hallii de Boer var. ochracea (de Boer) D.T.Cole, accepted as Lithops hallii de Boer, present
 Lithops helmutii L.Bolus, endemic
 Lithops herrei L.Bolus, indigenous
 Lithops herrei L.Bolus forma albiflora H.Jacobsen, accepted as Lithops marmorata (N.E.Br.) N.E.Br. present
 Lithops herrei L.Bolus var. geyeri(Nel) de Boer & Boom, accepted as Lithops geyeri Nel, present
 Lithops herrei L.Bolus var. plena L.Bolus, accepted as Lithops herrei L.Bolus, present
 Lithops hillii L.Bolus, accepted as Lithops geyeri Nel, present
 Lithops hookeri (A.Berger) Schwantes, endemic
 Lithops hookeri (A.Berger) Schwantes var. dabneri (L.Bolus) D.T.Cole, accepted as Lithops hookeri (A.Berger) Schwantes, present
 Lithops hookeri (A.Berger) Schwantes var. elephina (D.T.Cole) D.T.Cole, accepted as Lithops hookeri (A.Berger) Schwantes, present
 Lithops hookeri (A.Berger) Schwantes var. lutea (de Boer) D.T.Cole, accepted as Lithops hookeri (A.Berger) Schwantes, present
 Lithops hookeri (A.Berger) Schwantes var. marginata (Nel) D.T.Cole, accepted as Lithops hookeri (A.Berger) Schwantes, present
 Lithops hookeri (A.Berger) Schwantes var. subfenestrata (de Boer) D.T.Cole, accepted as Lithops hookeri (A.Berger) Schwantes, present
 Lithops hookeri (A.Berger) Schwantes var. susannae (D.T.Cole) D.T.Cole, accepted as Lithops hookeri (A.Berger) Schwantes, present
 Lithops inae Nel, accepted as Lithops verruculosa Nel, present
 Lithops insularis L.Bolus, accepted as Lithops bromfieldii L.Bolus, present
 Lithops julii (Dinter & Schwantes) N.E.Br. indigenous
 Lithops julii (Dinter & Schwantes) N.E.Br. subsp. fulleri (N.E.Br.) B.Fearn, endemic
 Lithops julii (Dinter & Schwantes) N.E.Br. subsp. fulleri (N.E.Br.) B.Fearn var. brunnea, accepted as Lithops julii (Dinter & Schwantes) N.E.Br. subsp. fulleri (N.E.Br.) B.Fearn, present
 Lithops julii (Dinter & Schwantes) N.E.Br. subsp. fulleri (N.E.Br.) B.Fearn var. rouxii, accepted as Lithops julii (Dinter & Schwantes) N.E.Br. subsp. fulleri (N.E.Br.) B.Fearn
 Lithops julii (Dinter & Schwantes) N.E.Br. var. littlewoodii de Boer, accepted as Lithops julii (Dinter & Schwantes) N.E.Br. subsp. julii 
 Lithops karasmontana (Dinter & Schwantes) N.E.Br. subsp. karasmontana var. aiaisensis, accepted as Lithops karasmontana (Dinter & Schwantes) N.E.Br. subsp. karasmontana
 Lithops karasmontana (Dinter & Schwantes) N.E.Br. subsp. karasmontana var. lericheana, accepted as Lithops karasmontana (Dinter & Schwantes) N.E.Br. subsp. karasmontana 
 Lithops karasmontana (Dinter & Schwantes) N.E.Br. subsp. karasmontana var. tischeri, accepted as Lithops karasmontana (Dinter & Schwantes) N.E.Br. subsp. karasmontana
 Lithops karasmontana (Dinter & Schwantes) N.E.Br. var. mickbergensis (Dinter) de Boer & Boom, accepted as Lithops karasmontana (Dinter & Schwantes) N.E.Br. subsp. karasmontana
 Lithops karasmontana (Dinter & Schwantes) N.E.Br. var. opalina (Dinter) de Boer & Boom, accepted as Lithops karasmontana (Dinter & Schwantes) N.E.Br. subsp. karasmontana
 Lithops karasmontana (Dinter & Schwantes) N.E.Br. var. summitatum (Dinter) de Boer & Boom, accepted as Lithops karasmontana (Dinter & Schwantes) N.E.Br. subsp. karasmontana
 Lithops koelemanii de Boer, accepted as Lithops aucampiae L.Bolus subsp. aucampiae, present
 Lithops kuibisensis Dinter ex H.Jacobsen, accepted as Lithops schwantesii Dinter subsp. schwantesii
 Lithops kunjasensis Dinter, accepted as Lithops schwantesii Dinter subsp. schwantesii
 Lithops lactea Schick & Tischer, accepted as Lithops julii (Dinter & Schwantes) N.E.Br. subsp. julii, present
 Lithops lateritia Dinter, accepted as Lithops karasmontana (Dinter & Schwantes) N.E.Br. subsp. karasmontana 
 Lithops lesliei (N.E.Br.) N.E.Br. indigenous
 Lithops lesliei (N.E.Br.) N.E.Br. forma minor (de Boer) B.Fearn, accepted as Lithops lesliei (N.E.Br.) N.E.Br. subsp. lesliei, present
 Lithops lesliei (N.E.Br.) N.E.Br. subsp. burchellii D.T.Cole, endemic
 Lithops lesliei (N.E.Br.) N.E.Br. subsp. lesliei, indigenous
 Lithops lesliei (N.E.Br.) N.E.Br. subsp. lesliei var. hornii, accepted as Lithops lesliei (N.E.Br.) N.E.Br. subsp. lesliei, present
 Lithops lesliei (N.E.Br.) N.E.Br. subsp. lesliei var. mariae, accepted as Lithops lesliei (N.E.Br.) N.E.Br. subsp. lesliei, present
 Lithops lesliei (N.E.Br.) N.E.Br. subsp. lesliei var. minor, accepted as Lithops lesliei (N.E.Br.) N.E.Br. subsp. lesliei, present
 Lithops lesliei (N.E.Br.) N.E.Br. subsp. lesliei var. rubrobrunnea, accepted as Lithops lesliei (N.E.Br.) N.E.Br. subsp. lesliei, present
 Lithops lesliei (N.E.Br.) N.E.Br. subsp. lesliei var. venteri, accepted as Lithops lesliei (N.E.Br.) N.E.Br. subsp. lesliei, present
 Lithops lesliei (N.E.Br.) N.E.Br. var. maraisii de Boer, accepted as Lithops lesliei (N.E.Br.) N.E.Br. subsp. lesliei, present
 Lithops localis (N.E.Br.) Schwantes, endemic
 Lithops marginata Nel, accepted as Lithops hookeri (A.Berger) Schwantes, present
 Lithops marmorata (N.E.Br.) N.E.Br. endemic
 Lithops marmorata (N.E.Br.) N.E.Br. var. elisae (de Boer) D.T.Cole, accepted as Lithops marmorata (N.E.Br.) N.E.Br. present
 Lithops marthae Loesch & Tischer, accepted as Lithops schwantesii Dinter subsp. schwantesii
 Lithops maughanii N.E.Br. accepted as Lithops julii (Dinter & Schwantes) N.E.Br. subsp. fulleri (N.E.Br.) B.Fearn, present
 Lithops mennellii L.Bolus, accepted as Lithops bromfieldii L.Bolus, present
 Lithops meyeri L.Bolus, endemic
 Lithops mickbergensis Dinter, accepted as Lithops karasmontana (Dinter & Schwantes) N.E.Br. subsp. karasmontana
 Lithops naureeniae D.T.Cole, endemic
 Lithops olivacea L.Bolus, endemic
 Lithops olivacea L.Bolus var. nebrownii D.T.Cole, accepted as Lithops olivacea L.Bolus, present
 Lithops opalina Dinter, accepted as Lithops karasmontana (Dinter & Schwantes) N.E.Br. subsp. karasmontana 
 Lithops otzeniana Nel, endemic
 Lithops otzeniana Nel var. weberi(Nel) B.Fearn, accepted as Lithops comptonii L.Bolus, present
 Lithops pseudotruncatella (A.Berger) N.E.Br. forma mundtii (Tischer) H.Jacobsen, accepted as Lithops pseudotruncatella (A.Berger) N.E.Br. subsp. pseudotruncatella
 Lithops pseudotruncatella (A.Berger) N.E.Br. subsp. pseudotruncatella var. elisabethae, accepted as Lithops pseudotruncatella (A.Berger) N.E.Br. subsp. pseudotruncatella
 Lithops pseudotruncatella (A.Berger) N.E.Br. subsp. pseudotruncatella var. riehmerae, accepted as Lithops pseudotruncatella (A.Berger) N.E.Br. subsp. pseudotruncatella
 Lithops pseudotruncatella (A.Berger) N.E.Br. var. alpina (Dinter) Boom, accepted as Lithops pseudotruncatella (A.Berger) N.E.Br. subsp. pseudotruncatella
 Lithops pseudotruncatella (A.Berger) N.E.Br. var. alta Tischer, accepted as Lithops pseudotruncatella (A.Berger) N.E.Br. subsp. pseudotruncatella
 Lithops pseudotruncatella (A.Berger) N.E.Br. var. archerae (de Boer) D.T.Cole, accepted as Lithops pseudotruncatella (A.Berger) N.E.Br. subsp. archerae (de Boer) D.T.Cole
 Lithops pseudotruncatella (A.Berger) N.E.Br. var. brandbergensis de Boer, accepted as Lithops gracilidelineata Dinter subsp. brandbergensis (de Boer) D.T.Cole
 Lithops pseudotruncatella (A.Berger) N.E.Br. var. dendritica(Nel) de Boer & Boom, accepted as Lithops pseudotruncatella (A.Berger) N.E.Br. subsp. dendritica (Nel) D.T.Cole
 Lithops pseudotruncatella (A.Berger) N.E.Br. var. edithiae (N.E.Br.) de Boer & Boom, accepted as Lithops pseudotruncatella (A.Berger) N.E.Br. subsp. pseudotruncatella
 Lithops pseudotruncatella (A.Berger) N.E.Br. var. gracilidelineata (Dinter) B.Fearn, accepted as Lithops gracilidelineata Dinter subsp. gracilidelineata
 Lithops pseudotruncatella (A.Berger) N.E.Br. var. gracilidelineata (Dinter) B.Fearn forma waldronae, accepted as Lithops gracilidelineata Dinter subsp. gracilidelineata 
 Lithops pseudotruncatella (A.Berger) N.E.Br. var. groendrayensis H.Jacobsen, accepted as Lithops pseudotruncatella (A.Berger) N.E.Br. subsp. groendrayensis (H.Jacobsen) D.T.Cole
 Lithops pseudotruncatella (A.Berger) N.E.Br. var. mundtii (Tischer) H.Jacobsen, accepted as Lithops pseudotruncatella (A.Berger) N.E.Br. subsp. pseudotruncatella
 Lithops pseudotruncatella (A.Berger) N.E.Br. var. volkii Schwantes ex de Boer & Boom, accepted as Lithops pseudotruncatella (A.Berger) N.E.Br. subsp. volkii (Schwantes ex de Boer & Boom) D.T.Cole
 Lithops rugosa Dinter, accepted as Lithops schwantesii Dinter subsp. schwantesii
 Lithops ruschiorum (Dinter & Schwantes) N.E.Br. var. lineata(Nel) D.T.Cole, accepted as Lithops ruschiorum (Dinter & Schwantes) N.E.Br.
 Lithops salicola L.Bolus, endemic
 Lithops schwantesii Dinter subsp. schwantesii var. marthae, accepted as Lithops schwantesii Dinter subsp. schwantesii
 Lithops schwantesii Dinter subsp. schwantesii var. rugosa, accepted as Lithops schwantesii Dinter subsp. schwantesii
 Lithops schwantesii Dinter subsp. schwantesii var. urikosensis, accepted as Lithops schwantesii Dinter subsp. schwantesii
 Lithops schwantesii Dinter var. christinae (de Boer) B.Fearn, accepted as Lithops schwantesii Dinter subsp. schwantesii
 Lithops schwantesii Dinter var. gebseri de Boer, accepted as Lithops schwantesii Dinter subsp. gebseri (de Boer) D.T.Cole
 Lithops schwantesii Dinter var. kunjasensis (Dinter) de Boer & Boom, accepted as Lithops schwantesii Dinter subsp. schwantesii
 Lithops schwantesii Dinter var. nutupsdriftensis de Boer, accepted as Lithops schwantesii Dinter subsp. schwantesii
 Lithops schwantesii Dinter var. triebneri (L.Bolus) de Boer & Boom, accepted as Lithops schwantesii Dinter subsp. schwantesii
 Lithops streyi Schwantes, accepted as Lithops gracilidelineata Dinter subsp. gracilidelineata 
 Lithops summitatum Dinter, accepted as Lithops karasmontana (Dinter & Schwantes) N.E.Br. subsp. karasmontana
 Lithops terricolor N.E.Br. accepted as Lithops localis (N.E.Br.) Schwantes, present
 Lithops translucens L.Bolus, accepted as Lithops herrei L.Bolus, present
 Lithops triebneri L.Bolus, accepted as Lithops schwantesii Dinter subsp. schwantesii
 Lithops umdausensis L.Bolus, accepted as Lithops marmorata (N.E.Br.) N.E.Br. present
 Lithops urikosensis Dinter, accepted as Lithops schwantesii Dinter subsp. schwantesii
 Lithops vallis-mariae (Dinter & Schwantes) N.E.Br. var. groendraaiensis(H.Jacobsen) de Boer, accepted as Lithops pseudotruncatella (A.Berger) N.E.Br. subsp. groendrayensis (H.Jacobsen) D.T.Cole
 Lithops vallis-mariae (Dinter & Schwantes) N.E.Br. var. margarethae de Boer, accepted as Lithops vallis-mariae (Dinter & Schwantes) N.E.Br.
 Lithops verruculosa Nel, endemic
 Lithops verruculosa Nel var. glabra de Boer, accepted as Lithops verruculosa Nel, present
 Lithops verruculosa Nel var. inae (Nel) de Boer & Boom, accepted as Lithops verruculosa Nel, present
 Lithops villetii L.Bolus, indigenous
 Lithops villetii L.Bolus subsp. deboeri (Schwantes) D.T.Cole, endemic
 Lithops villetii L.Bolus subsp. kennedyi (de Boer) D.T.Cole, endemic
 Lithops villetii L.Bolus subsp. villetii, endemic
 Lithops villetii L.Bolus var. deboeri (Schwantes) D.T.Cole, accepted as Lithops villetii L.Bolus subsp. deboeri (Schwantes) D.T.Cole, present
 Lithops villetii L.Bolus var. kennedyi (de Boer) D.T.Cole, accepted as Lithops villetii L.Bolus subsp. kennedyi (de Boer) D.T.Cole, present
 Lithops viridis H.A.Luckh. endemic
 Lithops weberi Nel, accepted as Lithops comptonii L.Bolus, present

Litocarpus 
Genus Litocarpus:
 Litocarpus cordifolius (L.f.) L.Bolus, accepted as Mesembryanthemum cordifolium L.f. indigenous

Machairophyllum 
Genus Machairophyllum:
 Machairophyllum acuminatum L.Bolus, accepted as Machairophyllum bijliae (N.E.Br.) L.Bolus, present
 Machairophyllum albidum (L.) Schwantes, endemic
 Machairophyllum baxteri L.Bolus, accepted as Machairophyllum bijliae (N.E.Br.) L.Bolus, present
 Machairophyllum bijliae (N.E.Br.) L.Bolus, endemic
 Machairophyllum brevifolium L.Bolus, endemic
 Machairophyllum cookii (L.Bolus) Schwantes, accepted as Machairophyllum albidum (L.) Schwantes, present
 Machairophyllum latifolium L.Bolus, accepted as Machairophyllum brevifolium L.Bolus, present
 Machairophyllum stayneri L.Bolus, endemic
 Machairophyllum stenopetalum L.Bolus, accepted as Machairophyllum bijliae (N.E.Br.) L.Bolus, present
 Machairophyllum vanbredai L.Bolus, accepted as Machairophyllum bijliae (N.E.Br.) L.Bolus, present

Malephora 
Genus Malephora:
 Malephora crassa (L.Bolus) H.Jacobsen & Schwantes, endemic
 Malephora crocea (Jacq.) Schwantes, endemic
 Malephora crocea (Jacq.) Schwantes var. purpureo-crocea (Haw.) H.Jacobsen, accepted as Malephora purpureo-crocea (Haw.) Schwantes, present
 Malephora flavo-crocea (Haw.) H.Jacobsen & Schwantes, endemic
 Malephora framesii (L.Bolus) H.Jacobsen & Schwantes, endemic
 Malephora herrei (Schwantes) Schwantes, endemic
 Malephora latipetala (L.Bolus) H.Jacobsen & Schwantes, endemic
 Malephora lutea (Haw.) Schwantes, endemic
 Malephora luteola (Haw.) Schwantes, endemic
 Malephora mollis (Aiton) N.E.Br. endemic
 Malephora ochracea (A.Berger) H.E.K.Hartmann, endemic
 Malephora pienaarii Van Jaarsv. endemic
 Malephora purpureo-crocea (Haw.) Schwantes, endemic
 Malephora smithii (L.Bolus) H.E.K.Hartmann, endemic
 Malephora thunbergii (Haw.) Schwantes, endemic
 Malephora uitenhagensis (L.Bolus) H.Jacobsen & Schwantes, endemic
 Malephora verruculoides (Sond.) Schwantes, endemic

Marlothistella 
Genus Marlothistella:
 Marlothistella stenophylla (L.Bolus) S.A.Hammer, endemic
 Marlothistella uniondalensis Schwantes, endemic

Maughaniella 
Genus Maughaniella:
 Maughaniella luckhoffii (L.Bolus) L.Bolus, accepted as Diplosoma luckhoffii (L.Bolus) Schwantes ex Ihlenf. present

Mentocalyx 
Genus Mentocalyx:
 Mentocalyx velutinum (L.Bolus) Schwantes, accepted as Gibbaeum velutinum (L.Bolus) Schwantes, indigenous

Mesembryanthemum 
Genus Mesembryanthemum:
 Mesembryanthemum aitonis Jacq. endemic
 Mesembryanthemum alatum (L.Bolus) L.Bolus, accepted as Mesembryanthemum guerichianum Pax, indigenous
 Mesembryanthemum albatum L.Bolus, accepted as Juttadinteria albata (L.Bolus) L.Bolus, present
 Mesembryanthemum alboroseum L.Bolus, accepted as Mesembryanthemum tetragonum Thunb. present
 Mesembryanthemum amabile (Gerbaulet & Struck) Klak, endemic
 Mesembryanthemum amplectens L.Bolus, endemic
 Mesembryanthemum anatomicum Haw. var. emarcidum (Thunb.) DC. accepted as Mesembryanthemum emarcidum Thunb. indigenous
 Mesembryanthemum anatomicum Haw. var. fragile Haw. accepted as Mesembryanthemum emarcidum Thunb. present
 Mesembryanthemum angulatum Thunb. accepted as Mesembryanthemum aitonis Jacq. indigenous
 Mesembryanthemum angulatum Thunb. var. ovatum (Thunb.) Sond. accepted as Mesembryanthemum aitonis Jacq. indigenous
 Mesembryanthemum annuum L.Bolus, accepted as Mesembryanthemum stenandrum (L.Bolus) L.Bolus, present
 Mesembryanthemum apiatum N.E.Br. accepted as Conophytum bilobum (Marloth) N.E.Br. subsp. bilobum var. bilobum, present
 Mesembryanthemum archeri (L.Bolus) Klak, endemic
 Mesembryanthemum arenosum L.Bolus, accepted as Lampranthus lavisii (L.Bolus) L.Bolus, indigenous
 Mesembryanthemum arenosum Schinz, indigenous
 Mesembryanthemum aristulatum Sond. accepted as Antimima aristulata (Sond.) Chess. & Gideon F.Sm. indigenous
 Mesembryanthemum articulatum Thunb. indigenous
 Mesembryanthemum auratum Sond. accepted as Mesembryanthemum nitidum Haw. indigenous
 Mesembryanthemum aureum Thunb. accepted as Mesembryanthemum nitidum Haw. indigenous
 Mesembryanthemum ausanum Dinter & A.Berger, accepted as Mesembryanthemum tetragonum Thunb. present
 Mesembryanthemum barklyi N.E.Br. indigenous
 Mesembryanthemum baylissii (L.Bolus) Klak, endemic
 Mesembryanthemum bellidiflorum L. accepted as Acrodon bellidiflorus (L.) N.E.Br. present
 Mesembryanthemum bellum (N.E.Br.) Dinter, accepted as Lithops karasmontana (Dinter & Schwantes) N.E.Br. subsp. bella (N.E.Br.) D.T.Cole
 Mesembryanthemum bibracteatum Eckl. & Zeyh. accepted as Bergeranthus multiceps (Salm-Dyck) Schwantes, indigenous
 Mesembryanthemum bicorne Sond. endemic
 Mesembryanthemum bilobum Marloth, accepted as Conophytum bilobum (Marloth) N.E.Br. subsp. bilobum var. bilobum, present
 Mesembryanthemum blandum Haw. accepted as Lampranthus multiradiatus (Jacq.) N.E.Br. indigenous
 Mesembryanthemum brachyphyllum Welw. accepted as Lampranthus glaucus (L.) N.E.Br. indigenous
 Mesembryanthemum breve L.Bolus, accepted as Mesembryanthemum crystallinum L. present
 Mesembryanthemum brevicarpum (L.Bolus) Klak, indigenous
 Mesembryanthemum bulletrapense Klak, endemic
 Mesembryanthemum caducum Klak, accepted as Mesembryanthemum flavidum Klak, indigenous
 Mesembryanthemum calamiforme L. accepted as Cylindrophyllum calamiforme (L.) Schwantes, present
 Mesembryanthemum canaliculatum Haw. endemic
 Mesembryanthemum capillaceum L.Bolus, accepted as Lampranthus falcatus (L.) N.E.Br. indigenous
 Mesembryanthemum carneum Haw. accepted as Mesembryanthemum spinuliferum Haw. indigenous
 Mesembryanthemum caudatum L.Bolus, endemic
 Mesembryanthemum chrysophthalmum (Gerbaulet & Struck) Klak, endemic
 Mesembryanthemum chrysum L.Bolus, accepted as Mesembryanthemum excavatum L.Bolus, present
 Mesembryanthemum citrinum L.Bolus, accepted as Lampranthus glaucus (L.) N.E.Br. indigenous
 Mesembryanthemum clandestinum Haw. endemic
 Mesembryanthemum commutatum A.Berger, accepted as Mesembryanthemum grossum Aiton, indigenous
 Mesembryanthemum comptum N.E.Br. accepted as Antimima aristulata (Sond.) Chess. & Gideon F.Sm. indigenous
 Mesembryanthemum corallinum Thunb. endemic
 Mesembryanthemum cordifolium L.f. indigenous
 Mesembryanthemum coriarium Burch. ex N.E.Br. indigenous
 Mesembryanthemum crassicaule Haw. endemic
 Mesembryanthemum cryocalyx L.Bolus, accepted as Mesembryanthemum longistylum DC. indigenous
 Mesembryanthemum cryptanthum Hook.f. indigenous
 Mesembryanthemum crystallino-papillosum Bolus ex Fedde & J.Schust. accepted as Mesembryanthemum oculatum N.E.Br. indigenous
 Mesembryanthemum crystallinum L. indigenous
 Mesembryanthemum crystallophanes Eckl. & Zeyh. accepted as Mesembryanthemum aitonis Jacq. indigenous
 Mesembryanthemum cylindricum Haw. accepted as Calamophyllum cylindricum (Haw.) Schwantes, present
 Mesembryanthemum cymosum L.Bolus, accepted as Ruschia pungens (A.Berger) H.Jacobsen, indigenous
 Mesembryanthemum damaranum N.E.Br. accepted as Lithops karasmontana (Dinter & Schwantes) N.E.Br. subsp. karasmontana
 Mesembryanthemum deciduum (L.Bolus) Klak, endemic
 Mesembryanthemum decurrens (L.Bolus) N.E.Br. accepted as Ruschia decurrens L.Bolus$
 Mesembryanthemum decurvatum (L.Bolus) Klak, endemic
 Mesembryanthemum defoliatum Haw. accepted as Mesembryanthemum noctiflorum L. subsp. defoliatum (Haw.) Klak, indigenous
 Mesembryanthemum dejagerae (L.Bolus) N.E.Br. accepted as Ruschia dejagerae L.Bolus, present
 Mesembryanthemum deliciosum L.Bolus, accepted as Carpobrotus deliciosus (L.Bolus) L.Bolus, present
 Mesembryanthemum delum L.Bolus, endemic
 Mesembryanthemum densipetalum L.Bolus, accepted as Lampranthus densipetalus (L.Bolus) L.Bolus, indigenous
 Mesembryanthemum difforme Thunb. accepted as Cheiridopsis namaquensis (Sond.) H.E.K.Hartmann, present
 Mesembryanthemum digitatum Aiton, endemic
 Mesembryanthemum digitatum Aiton subsp. digitatum, endemic
 Mesembryanthemum digitatum Aiton subsp. littlewoodii (L.Bolus) Klak, endemic
 Mesembryanthemum digitiforme Thunb. accepted as Mesembryanthemum digitatum Aiton subsp. digitatum, present
 Mesembryanthemum dimidiatum Haw. accepted as Carpobrotus dimidiatus (Haw.) L.Bolus, present
 Mesembryanthemum dinteri Engl. indigenous
 Mesembryanthemum emarcidum Thunb. endemic
 Mesembryanthemum englishiae L.Bolus, endemic
 Mesembryanthemum eurystigmatum Gerbaulet, endemic
 Mesembryanthemum exalatum (Gerbaulet) Klak, endemic
 Mesembryanthemum excavatum L.Bolus, endemic
 Mesembryanthemum excedens L.Bolus, accepted as Oscularia excedens (L.Bolus) H.E.K.Hartmann, present
 Mesembryanthemum expansum L. endemic
 Mesembryanthemum falcatum L. accepted as Lampranthus falcatus (L.) N.E.Br. indigenous
 Mesembryanthemum falcatum L. var. galpinii L.Bolus, accepted as Lampranthus falcatus (L.) N.E.Br. indigenous
 Mesembryanthemum fastigiatum Thunb. endemic
 Mesembryanthemum flavidum Klak, endemic
 Mesembryanthemum gariepense (Gerbaulet & Struck) Klak, endemic
 Mesembryanthemum gariusanum Dinter, indigenous
 Mesembryanthemum geniculiflorum L. indigenous
 Mesembryanthemum glareicola (Klak) Klak, endemic
 Mesembryanthemum glaucum L. accepted as Lampranthus glaucus (L.) N.E.Br. indigenous
 Mesembryanthemum glaucum L. var. tortuosum Salm-Dyck, accepted as Lampranthus glaucus (L.) N.E.Br. indigenous
 Mesembryanthemum glaucus (L.) Rothm. accepted as Lampranthus glaucus (L.) N.E.Br. indigenous
 Mesembryanthemum graniticum L.Bolus, accepted as Antimima granitica (L.Bolus) H.E.K.Hartmann, indigenous
 Mesembryanthemum granulicaule Haw. indigenous
 Mesembryanthemum grossum Aiton, endemic
 Mesembryanthemum guerichianum Pax, indigenous
 Mesembryanthemum haeckelianum A.Berger, endemic
 Mesembryanthemum halenbergense Dinter & Schwantes, accepted as Conophytum halenbergense (Dinter & Schwantes) N.E.Br. present
 Mesembryanthemum hesperanthum L.Bolus, accepted as Mesembryanthemum longistylum DC. indigenous
 Mesembryanthemum holense Klak, endemic
 Mesembryanthemum horridum Koutnik & Lavis, accepted as Mesembryanthemum guerichianum Pax, present
 Mesembryanthemum hypertrophicum Dinter, indigenous
 Mesembryanthemum inachabense Engl. indigenous
 Mesembryanthemum incurvum Haw. var. multiradiatum (Jacq.) DC. accepted as Lampranthus multiradiatus (Jacq.) N.E.Br. indigenous
 Mesembryanthemum inornatum L.Bolus, accepted as Mesembryanthemum nodiflorum L. present
 Mesembryanthemum intransparens L.Bolus var. laxum (L.Bolus) L.Bolus, accepted as Mesembryanthemum guerichianum Pax, present
 Mesembryanthemum intricatum N.E.Br. accepted as Ruschia intricata (N.E.Br.) H.E.K.Hartmann & Stuber, present
 Mesembryanthemum johannis-winkleri Dinter & Schwantes, accepted as Conophytum pageae (N.E.Br.) N.E.Br. present
 Mesembryanthemum jucundum N.E.Br. accepted as Conophytum jucundum (N.E.Br.) N.E.Br. subsp. jucundum, present
 Mesembryanthemum junceum Haw. endemic
 Mesembryanthemum juritzii L.Bolus, accepted as Carpobrotus dimidiatus (Haw.) L.Bolus, present
 Mesembryanthemum karrooense L.Bolus, accepted as Mesembryanthemum guerichianum Pax, present
 Mesembryanthemum knolfonteinense Klak, indigenous
 Mesembryanthemum labyrintheum N.E.Br. accepted as Conophytum minimum (Haw.) N.E.Br. present
 Mesembryanthemum ladismithiense Klak, endemic
 Mesembryanthemum lanceolatum Haw. accepted as Mesembryanthemum aitonis Jacq. indigenous
 Mesembryanthemum lanceum Thunb. accepted as Mesembryanthemum pallens Aiton subsp. lanceum (Thunb.) Klak, indigenous
 Mesembryanthemum lancifolium (L.Bolus) Klak, endemic
 Mesembryanthemum latipetalum (L.Bolus) Klak, endemic
 Mesembryanthemum latisepalum (L.Bolus) L.Bolus, accepted as Mesembryanthemum guerichianum Pax$
 Mesembryanthemum latum L.Bolus, accepted as Lampranthus densipetalus (L.Bolus) L.Bolus, indigenous
 Mesembryanthemum lavisii L.Bolus, accepted as Lampranthus lavisii (L.Bolus) L.Bolus, indigenous
 Mesembryanthemum leptarthron A.Berger, endemic
 Mesembryanthemum lericheanum Dinter & Schwantes, accepted as Lithops karasmontana (Dinter & Schwantes) N.E.Br. subsp. karasmontana
 Mesembryanthemum liebendalense L.Bolus, accepted as Mesembryanthemum stenandrum (L.Bolus) L.Bolus, present
 Mesembryanthemum lignescens (L.Bolus) Klak, indigenous
 Mesembryanthemum ligneum (L.Bolus) Klak, indigenous
 Mesembryanthemum lilliputanum Klak, endemic
 Mesembryanthemum limbatum N.E.Br. accepted as Antimima granitica (L.Bolus) H.E.K.Hartmann, indigenous
 Mesembryanthemum linearifolium L.Bolus, accepted as Mesembryanthemum longistylum DC. indigenous
 Mesembryanthemum longipapillosum Dinter, indigenous
 Mesembryanthemum longispinulum Haw. accepted as Mesembryanthemum grossum Aiton, indigenous
 Mesembryanthemum longispinulum Salm-Dyck, accepted as Mesembryanthemum grossum Aiton, indigenous
 Mesembryanthemum longistamineum L.Bolus, accepted as Lampranthus glaucus (L.) N.E.Br. indigenous
 Mesembryanthemum longistylum DC. endemic
 Mesembryanthemum loratum Haw. accepted as Mesembryanthemum pallens Aiton subsp. pallens, present
 Mesembryanthemum louiseae L.Bolus, accepted as Mesembryanthemum paulum (N.E.Br.) L.Bolus, indigenous
 Mesembryanthemum macrophyllum L.Bolus, accepted as Mesembryanthemum barklyi N.E.Br. present
 Mesembryanthemum macrostigma L.Bolus, accepted as Mesembryanthemum guerichianum Pax, present
 Mesembryanthemum maritimum L.Bolus, accepted as Jordaaniella maritima (L.Bolus) Van Jaarsv. indigenous
 Mesembryanthemum marlothii Pax, indigenous
 Mesembryanthemum melanospermum Dinter, accepted as Mesembryanthemum ligneum (L.Bolus) Klak, indigenous
 Mesembryanthemum multiceps Salm-Dyck, accepted as Bergeranthus multiceps (Salm-Dyck) Schwantes, indigenous
 Mesembryanthemum multiradiatum Jacq. accepted as Lampranthus multiradiatus (Jacq.) N.E.Br. indigenous
 Mesembryanthemum napierense Klak, endemic
 Mesembryanthemum neglectum (S.M.Pierce & Gerbaulet) Klak, indigenous
 Mesembryanthemum neilsoniae (L.Bolus) L.Bolus, accepted as Mesembryanthemum guerichianum Pax, indigenous
 Mesembryanthemum neofoliosum Klak, endemic
 Mesembryanthemum nevillei N.E.Br. accepted as Conophytum obcordellum (Haw.) N.E.Br. subsp. obcordellum var. obcordellum, present
 Mesembryanthemum nitidum Haw. endemic
 Mesembryanthemum noctiflorum L. indigenous
 Mesembryanthemum noctiflorum L. subsp. defoliatum (Haw.) Klak, endemic
 Mesembryanthemum noctiflorum L. subsp. noctiflorum, indigenous
 Mesembryanthemum noctiflorum L. subsp. stramineum (Haw.) Klak, indigenous
 Mesembryanthemum noctiflorum L. var. stramineum (Haw.) Haw. accepted as Mesembryanthemum noctiflorum L. subsp. stramineum (Haw.) Klak, indigenous
 Mesembryanthemum nodiflorum L. indigenous
 Mesembryanthemum nucifer (Ihlenf. & Bittrich) Klak, indigenous
 Mesembryanthemum obconellum Haw. accepted as Conophytum obcordellum (Haw.) N.E.Br. subsp. obcordellum var. obcordellum, present
 Mesembryanthemum obcordellum Haw. accepted as Conophytum obcordellum (Haw.) N.E.Br. subsp. obcordellum var. obcordellum, present
 Mesembryanthemum obmetale N.E.Br. accepted as Conophytum minimum (Haw.) N.E.Br. present
 Mesembryanthemum obsubulatum Haw. accepted as Cylindrophyllum obsubulatum (Haw.) Schwantes, present
 Mesembryanthemum occidentale Klak, endemic
 Mesembryanthemum oculatum N.E.Br. indigenous
 Mesembryanthemum olivaceum Schltr. accepted as Mesembryanthemum tenuiflorum Jacq. indigenous
 Mesembryanthemum orpenii N.E.Br. accepted as Prepodesma orpenii (N.E.Br.) N.E.Br. present
 Mesembryanthemum oubergense (L.Bolus) Klak, endemic
 Mesembryanthemum ovatum Thunb. accepted as Mesembryanthemum aitonis Jacq. indigenous
 Mesembryanthemum pachypus L.Bolus, accepted as Mesembryanthemum fastigiatum Thunb. present
 Mesembryanthemum pageae N.E.Br. accepted as Conophytum pageae (N.E.Br.) N.E.Br. present
 Mesembryanthemum pallens Aiton, endemic
 Mesembryanthemum pallens Aiton subsp. lanceum (Thunb.) Klak, endemic
 Mesembryanthemum pallens Aiton subsp. lutea (L.Bolus) Gerbaulet, accepted as Mesembryanthemum pallens Aiton subsp. luteum (L.Bolus) Klak, indigenous
 Mesembryanthemum pallens Aiton subsp. luteum (L.Bolus) Klak, endemic
 Mesembryanthemum pallens Aiton subsp. namaquense (Gerbaulet) Klak, endemic
 Mesembryanthemum pallens Aiton subsp. pallens, endemic
 Mesembryanthemum pallescens Haw. accepted as Mesembryanthemum pallens Aiton subsp. pallens, present
 Mesembryanthemum pallidum L.Bolus, accepted as Lampranthus dilutus N.E.Br. present
 Mesembryanthemum pallidum N.E.Br. accepted as Conophytum ficiforme (Haw.) N.E.Br. present
 Mesembryanthemum palustre L.Bolus, accepted as Lampranthus glaucus (L.) N.E.Br. indigenous
 Mesembryanthemum papulosum L.f. accepted as Cleretum papulosum (L.f.) L.Bolus subsp. papulosum, present
 Mesembryanthemum parviflorum Jacq. indigenous
 Mesembryanthemum parvipapillatum L.Bolus, accepted as Mesembryanthemum guerichianum Pax, present
 Mesembryanthemum parvipetalum N.E.Br. accepted as Conophytum obcordellum (Haw.) N.E.Br. subsp. obcordellum var. obcordellum, present
 Mesembryanthemum parvulum Schltr. accepted as Cephalophyllum parvulum (Schltr.) H.E.K.Hartmann, present
 Mesembryanthemum paucandrum L.Bolus, accepted as Mesembryanthemum nodiflorum L. present
 Mesembryanthemum paulum (N.E.Br.) L.Bolus, endemic
 Mesembryanthemum pauxillum N.E.Br. accepted as Conophytum minimum (Haw.) N.E.Br. present
 Mesembryanthemum pellitum Friedrich, indigenous
 Mesembryanthemum perlatum Dinter, accepted as Mesembryanthemum guerichianum Pax, present
 Mesembryanthemum perpusillum Haw. accepted as Conophytum minimum (Haw.) N.E.Br. present
 Mesembryanthemum pfeilii Engl. accepted as Mesembryanthemum tetragonum Thunb. present
 Mesembryanthemum pictum N.E.Br. accepted as Conophytum minimum (Haw.) N.E.Br. present
 Mesembryanthemum prasinum (L.Bolus) Klak, endemic
 Mesembryanthemum pseudoausanum Dinter, accepted as Mesembryanthemum tetragonum Thunb. present
 Mesembryanthemum pseudoschlichtianum (S.M.Pierce & Gerbaulet) Klak, indigenous
 Mesembryanthemum puberulum Haw. accepted as Mesembryanthemum aitonis Jacq. indigenous
 Mesembryanthemum pumilum (L.Bolus) Klak, accepted as Mesembryanthemum oubergense (L.Bolus) Klak, endemic
 Mesembryanthemum pungens A.Berger, accepted as Ruschia pungens (A.Berger) H.Jacobsen, indigenous
 Mesembryanthemum purpureoroseum L.Bolus, accepted as Mesembryanthemum guerichianum Pax, present
 Mesembryanthemum purpusii Schwantes, accepted as Conophytum truncatum (Thunb.) N.E.Br. subsp. truncatum var. truncatum, present
 Mesembryanthemum pusillum N.E.Br. accepted as Conophytum minimum (Haw.) N.E.Br. present
 Mesembryanthemum quaesitum N.E.Br. accepted as Conophytum quaesitum (N.E.Br.) N.E.Br. subsp. quaesitum var. quaesitum, present
 Mesembryanthemum quartziticola Klak, endemic
 Mesembryanthemum quinangulatum L.Bolus, accepted as Mesembryanthemum guerichianum Pax, present
 Mesembryanthemum rabiei (L.Bolus) Klak, endemic
 Mesembryanthemum radicans (L.Bolus) Klak, accepted as Mesembryanthemum rhizophorum Klak, endemic
 Mesembryanthemum rapaceum Jacq. endemic
 Mesembryanthemum relaxatum Willd. accepted as Mesembryanthemum pallens Aiton subsp. pallens, present
 Mesembryanthemum reptans Aiton, accepted as Lampranthus reptans (Aiton) N.E.Br. indigenous
 Mesembryanthemum resurgens Kensit, endemic
 Mesembryanthemum rhizophorum Klak, endemic
 Mesembryanthemum rhodanthum L.Bolus, accepted as Mesembryanthemum guerichianum Pax, present
 Mesembryanthemum rubrocinctum Haw. accepted as Carpobrotus acinaciformis (L.) L.Bolus, present
 Mesembryanthemum rubroroseum L.Bolus, accepted as Mesembryanthemum guerichianum Pax, present
 Mesembryanthemum salicornioides Pax, indigenous
 Mesembryanthemum salmoneum Haw. accepted as Mesembryanthemum canaliculatum Haw. indigenous
 Mesembryanthemum salmoneum Salm-Dyck, accepted as Mesembryanthemum canaliculatum Haw. indigenous
 Mesembryanthemum scapigerum Haw. accepted as Bergeranthus scapiger (Haw.) Schwantes, indigenous
 Mesembryanthemum schenkii Schinz, indigenous
 Mesembryanthemum schlichtianum Sond. accepted as Mesembryanthemum arenosum Schinz, indigenous
 Mesembryanthemum scintillans Dinter, accepted as Mesembryanthemum oculatum N.E.Br. indigenous
 Mesembryanthemum sedentiflorum (L.Bolus) L.Bolus, accepted as Mesembryanthemum guerichianum Pax, present
 Mesembryanthemum sedoides Dinter & A.Berger, accepted as Eberlanzia sedoides (Dinter & A.Berger) Schwantes, present
 Mesembryanthemum serotinum (L.Bolus) Klak, indigenous
 Mesembryanthemum serpens L.Bolus, accepted as Lampranthus reptans (Aiton) N.E.Br. indigenous
 Mesembryanthemum serratum L. accepted as Circandra serrata (L.) N.E.Br. present
 Mesembryanthemum sessiliflorum Aiton var. album Haw. accepted as Mesembryanthemum aitonis Jacq. indigenous
 Mesembryanthemum sinuosum L.Bolus, endemic
 Mesembryanthemum sladenianum L.Bolus, indigenous
 Mesembryanthemum spinuliferum Haw. endemic
 Mesembryanthemum spinuliforme Harv. & Sond. accepted as Mesembryanthemum spinuliferum Haw. indigenous
 Mesembryanthemum splendens L. endemic
 Mesembryanthemum splendens L. subsp. pentagonum (L.Bolus) Klak, endemic
 Mesembryanthemum splendens L. subsp. splendens, endemic
 Mesembryanthemum springbokense Klak, endemic
 Mesembryanthemum squamulosum (L.Bolus) L.Bolus, accepted as Mesembryanthemum guerichianum Pax, present
 Mesembryanthemum stenandrum (L.Bolus) L.Bolus, endemic
 Mesembryanthemum stenophyllum L.Bolus, accepted as Marlothistella stenophylla (L.Bolus) S.A.Hammer, present
 Mesembryanthemum stramineum Haw. accepted as Mesembryanthemum noctiflorum L. subsp. stramineum (Haw.) Klak, indigenous
 Mesembryanthemum stratum L.Bolus, accepted as Mesembryanthemum paulum (N.E.Br.) L.Bolus, indigenous
 Mesembryanthemum suaveolens L.Bolus, accepted as Mesembryanthemum lignescens (L.Bolus) Klak, indigenous
 Mesembryanthemum subnodosum A.Berger, indigenous
 Mesembryanthemum subrigidum L.Bolus, accepted as Mesembryanthemum guerichianum Pax, present
 Mesembryanthemum subrisum N.E.Br. accepted as Conophytum pageae (N.E.Br.) N.E.Br. present
 Mesembryanthemum subtereticaule L.Bolus, accepted as Mesembryanthemum guerichianum Pax, present
 Mesembryanthemum subtruncatum L.Bolus, endemic
 Mesembryanthemum suffruticosum (L.Bolus) Klak, endemic
 Mesembryanthemum taylorianum Dinter & Schwantes, accepted as Conophytum taylorianum (Dinter & Schwantes) N.E.Br. subsp. taylorianum, present
 Mesembryanthemum tenuiflorum Jacq. endemic
 Mesembryanthemum teretiusculum Haw. accepted as Calamophyllum teretiusculum (Haw.) Schwantes, present
 Mesembryanthemum tetragonum Thunb. indigenous
 Mesembryanthemum tomentosum Klak, indigenous
 Mesembryanthemum tortuosum L. endemic
 Mesembryanthemum trichotomum Thunb. endemic
 Mesembryanthemum vaginatum Lam. endemic
 Mesembryanthemum vanheerdei (L.Bolus) Klak, endemic
 Mesembryanthemum vanrensburgii (L.Bolus) Klak, endemic
 Mesembryanthemum varians Haw. endemic
 Mesembryanthemum velutinum L.Bolus, accepted as Gibbaeum velutinum (L.Bolus) Schwantes, indigenous
 Mesembryanthemum vespertinum A.Berger, accepted as Bergeranthus vespertinus (A.Berger) Schwantes, indigenous
 Mesembryanthemum vigilans L.Bolus, accepted as Mesembryanthemum longistylum DC. indigenous
 Mesembryanthemum violense L.Bolus, accepted as Mesembryanthemum gariusanum Dinter, present
 Mesembryanthemum viridiflorum Aiton, endemic
 Mesembryanthemum volckameri Haw. accepted as Mesembryanthemum aitonis Jacq. indigenous
 Mesembryanthemum woodburniae L.Bolus, accepted as Lampranthus reptans (Aiton) N.E.Br. indigenous

Mestoklema 
Genus Mestoklema:
 Mestoklema albanicum N.E.Br. ex Glen, endemic
 Mestoklema arboriforme (Burch.) N.E.Br. ex Glen, endemic
 Mestoklema copiosum N.E.Br. ex Glen, endemic
 Mestoklema elatum N.E.Br. ex Glen, endemic
 Mestoklema illepidum N.E.Br. ex Glen, endemic
 Mestoklema tuberosum (L.) N.E.Br. ex Glen, endemic
 Mestoklema tuberosum (L.) N.E.Br. ex Glen var. macrorrhizum (Haw.) N.E.Br. ex Glen, accepted as Mestoklema tuberosum (L.) N.E.Br. ex Glen, present

Meyerophytum 
Genus Meyerophytum:
 Meyerophytum globosum (L.Bolus) Ihlenf. endemic
 Meyerophytum meyeri (Schwantes) Schwantes, endemic
 Meyerophytum meyeri (Schwantes) Schwantes var. holgatense L.Bolus, accepted as Meyerophytum meyeri (Schwantes) Schwantes, present

Micropterum 
Genus Micropterum:
 Micropterum puberulum (Haw.) Schwantes, accepted as Mesembryanthemum aitonis Jacq. indigenous
 Micropterum sessiliflorum (Aiton) Schwantes var. album (Haw.) H.Jacobsen, accepted as Mesembryanthemum aitonis Jacq. indigenous

Mitrophyllum 
Genus Mitrophyllum:
 Mitrophyllum abbreviatum L.Bolus, endemic
 Mitrophyllum clivorum (N.E.Br.) Schwantes, endemic
 Mitrophyllum crassifolium (L.Bolus) G.D.Rowley, accepted as Mitrophyllum grande N.E.Br. present
 Mitrophyllum dissitum (N.E.Br.) Schwantes, endemic
 Mitrophyllum grande N.E.Br. endemic
 Mitrophyllum mitratum (Marloth) Schwantes, endemic
 Mitrophyllum parvifolium (L.Bolus) G.D.Rowley, accepted as Mitrophyllum dissitum (N.E.Br.) Schwantes, present
 Mitrophyllum pillansii N.E.Br. accepted as Mitrophyllum grande N.E.Br. present
 Mitrophyllum roseum L.Bolus, endemic

Monilaria 
Genus Monilaria:
 Monilaria chrysoleuca (Schltr.) Schwantes, endemic
 Monilaria chrysoleuca (Schltr.) Schwantes var. polita (L.Bolus) Ihlenf. & S.Jorg. accepted as Monilaria chrysoleuca (Schltr.) Schwantes, present
 Monilaria globosa (L.Bolus) L.Bolus, accepted as Meyerophytum globosum (L.Bolus) Ihlenf. present
 Monilaria moniliformis (Thunb.) Ihlenf. & S.Jorg. endemic
 Monilaria obconica Ihlenf. & S.Jorg. endemic
 Monilaria pisiformis (Haw.) Schwantes, endemic
 Monilaria scutata (L.Bolus) Schwantes, indigenous
 Monilaria scutata (L.Bolus) Schwantes subsp. obovata Ihlenf. & S.Jorg. endemic
 Monilaria scutata (L.Bolus) Schwantes subsp. scutata, endemic

Mossia 
Genus Mossia:
 Mossia intervallaris (L.Bolus) N.E.Br. indigenous

Muiria 
Genus Muiria:
 Muiria hortenseae N.E.Br. accepted as Gibbaeum hortenseae (N.E.Br.) Thiede & Klak, endemic

Namaquanthus 
Genus Namaquanthus:
 Namaquanthus vanheerdii L.Bolus, endemic

Nananthus 
Genus Nananthus:
 Nananthus aloides (Haw.) Schwantes, indigenous
 Nananthus aloides (Haw.) Schwantes var. latus L.Bolus, accepted as Nananthus aloides (Haw.) Schwantes, present
 Nananthus aloides (Haw.) Schwantes var. striatus (L.Bolus) L.Bolus, accepted as Nananthus vittatus (N.E.Br.) Schwantes, present
 Nananthus broomii (L.Bolus) L.Bolus, accepted as Nananthus vittatus (N.E.Br.) Schwantes, present
 Nananthus gerstneri (L.Bolus) L.Bolus, endemic
 Nananthus margaritiferus L.Bolus, indigenous
 Nananthus pallens (L.Bolus) L.Bolus, endemic
 Nananthus peersii L.Bolus, accepted as Deilanthe peersii (L.Bolus) N.E.Br. present
 Nananthus pole-evansii N.E.Br. endemic
 Nananthus transvaalensis (Rolfe) L.Bolus var. transvaalensis, accepted as Nananthus vittatus (N.E.Br.) Schwantes, present
 Nananthus transvaalensis (Rolfe) L.Bolus var. latus L.Bolus, accepted as Nananthus vittatus (N.E.Br.) Schwantes, present
 Nananthus vittatus (N.E.Br.) Schwantes, indigenous
 Nananthus wilmaniae (L.Bolus) L.Bolus, accepted as Nananthus aloides (Haw.) Schwantes, present

Nelia 
Genus Nelia:
 Nelia meyeri Schwantes, accepted as Nelia pillansii (N.E.Br.) Schwantes, present
 Nelia pillansii (N.E.Br.) Schwantes, endemic
 Nelia robusta Schwantes, accepted as Nelia pillansii (N.E.Br.) Schwantes, present
 Nelia schlechteri Schwantes, endemic

Neohenricia 
Genus Neohenricia:
 Neohenricia sibbettii (L.Bolus) L.Bolus, endemic
 Neohenricia spiculata S.A.Hammer, endemic

Nycteranthus 
Genus Nycteranthus:
 Nycteranthus abbreviatus (L.Bolus) Schwantes, accepted as Mesembryanthemum lilliputanum Klak, indigenous
 Nycteranthus albertensis (L.Bolus) Schwantes, accepted as Mesembryanthemum oubergense (L.Bolus) Klak, indigenous
 Nycteranthus anguineus (L.Bolus) Schwantes, accepted as Mesembryanthemum oculatum N.E.Br. indigenous
 Nycteranthus arenicolus (L.Bolus) Schwantes, accepted as Mesembryanthemum oculatum N.E.Br. indigenous
 Nycteranthus aureus (Thunb.) Schwantes, accepted as Mesembryanthemum nitidum Haw. indigenous
 Nycteranthus ausanus (Dinter & A.Berger) Schwantes, accepted as Mesembryanthemum tetragonum Thunb. present
 Nycteranthus brevicarpus (L.Bolus) Schwantes, accepted as Mesembryanthemum brevicarpum (L.Bolus) Klak, indigenous
 Nycteranthus canaliculatus (Haw.) Schwantes, accepted as Mesembryanthemum canaliculatum Haw. indigenous
 Nycteranthus carneus (Haw.) Schwantes, accepted as Mesembryanthemum spinuliferum Haw. indigenous
 Nycteranthus caudatus (L.Bolus) Schwantes, accepted as Mesembryanthemum caudatum L.Bolus, indigenous
 Nycteranthus commutatus (A.Berger) Schwantes, accepted as Mesembryanthemum grossum Aiton, indigenous
 Nycteranthus congestus (L.Bolus) Schwantes, accepted as Mesembryanthemum flavidum Klak, indigenous
 Nycteranthus deciduus (L.Bolus) Schwantes, accepted as Mesembryanthemum deciduum (L.Bolus) Klak, indigenous
 Nycteranthus decurvatus (L.Bolus) Schwantes, accepted as Mesembryanthemum decurvatum (L.Bolus) Klak, indigenous
 Nycteranthus defoliatus (Haw.) Schwantes, accepted as Mesembryanthemum noctiflorum L. subsp. defoliatum (Haw.) Klak, indigenous
 Nycteranthus delus (L.Bolus) Schwantes, accepted as Mesembryanthemum delum L.Bolus, indigenous
 Nycteranthus dinteri (L.Bolus) Schwantes, accepted as Mesembryanthemum ligneum (L.Bolus) Klak, indigenous
 Nycteranthus elongatus (L.Bolus) Schwantes, accepted as Mesembryanthemum prasinum (L.Bolus) Klak, indigenous
 Nycteranthus englishiae (L.Bolus) Schwantes, accepted as Mesembryanthemum englishiae L.Bolus, indigenous
 Nycteranthus fragilis (N.E.Br.) Schwantes, accepted as Mesembryanthemum oculatum N.E.Br. indigenous
 Nycteranthus framesii (L.Bolus) Schwantes, accepted as Mesembryanthemum spinuliferum Haw. indigenous
 Nycteranthus geniculiflorus (L.) Schwantes, accepted as Mesembryanthemum geniculiflorum L. indigenous
 Nycteranthus glanduliferus (L.Bolus) Schwantes, accepted as Mesembryanthemum sinuosum L.Bolus, indigenous
 Nycteranthus godmaniae (L.Bolus) Schwantes, accepted as Mesembryanthemum sinuosum L.Bolus, indigenous
 Nycteranthus gratiae (L.Bolus) Schwantes, accepted as Mesembryanthemum grossum Aiton, indigenous
 Nycteranthus grossus (Aiton) Schwantes, accepted as Mesembryanthemum grossum Aiton, indigenous
 Nycteranthus herbertii (N.E.Br.) Schwantes, accepted as Mesembryanthemum lilliputanum Klak, indigenous
 Nycteranthus inaequalis (L.Bolus) Schwantes, accepted as Mesembryanthemum nitidum Haw. indigenous
 Nycteranthus latipetalus (L.Bolus) Schwantes, accepted as Mesembryanthemum latipetalum (L.Bolus) Klak, indigenous
 Nycteranthus laxipetalus (L.Bolus) Schwantes, accepted as Mesembryanthemum grossum Aiton, indigenous
 Nycteranthus laxus (L.Bolus) Schwantes, accepted as Mesembryanthemum decurvatum (L.Bolus) Klak, present
 Nycteranthus ligneus (L.Bolus) Schwantes, accepted as Mesembryanthemum ligneum (L.Bolus) Klak, indigenous
 Nycteranthus longispinulus (Haw.) Schwantes, accepted as Mesembryanthemum grossum Aiton, indigenous
 Nycteranthus longistylus (DC.) Schwantes, accepted as Mesembryanthemum longistylum DC. indigenous
 Nycteranthus longitubus (L.Bolus) Schwantes, accepted as Mesembryanthemum tenuiflorum Jacq. indigenous
 Nycteranthus luteoalbus (L.Bolus) Schwantes, accepted as Mesembryanthemum tetragonum Thunb. indigenous
 Nycteranthus macrosiphon (L.Bolus) Schwantes, accepted as Mesembryanthemum tenuiflorum Jacq. indigenous
 Nycteranthus multiseriatus (L.Bolus) Schwantes, accepted as Mesembryanthemum prasinum (L.Bolus) Klak, indigenous
 Nycteranthus mutans (L.Bolus) Schwantes, accepted as Mesembryanthemum tetragonum Thunb. present
 Nycteranthus noctiflorus (L.) Rothm. accepted as Mesembryanthemum noctiflorum L. subsp. noctiflorum, indigenous
 Nycteranthus obtusus (L.Bolus) Schwantes, accepted as Mesembryanthemum decurvatum (L.Bolus) Klak, present
 Nycteranthus oculatus (N.E.Br.) Schwantes, accepted as Mesembryanthemum oculatum N.E.Br. indigenous
 Nycteranthus oubergensis (L.Bolus) Schwantes, accepted as Mesembryanthemum oubergense (L.Bolus) Klak, indigenous
 Nycteranthus parvisepalus (L.Bolus) Schwantes, accepted as Mesembryanthemum spinuliferum Haw. indigenous
 Nycteranthus pentagonus (L.Bolus) Schwantes, accepted as Mesembryanthemum splendens L. subsp. pentagonum (L.Bolus) Klak, indigenous
 Nycteranthus pentagonus (L.Bolus) Schwantes var. occidentalis (L.Bolus) Schwantes, accepted as Mesembryanthemum splendens L. subsp. pentagonum (L.Bolus) Klak, indigenous
 Nycteranthus platysepalus (L.Bolus) Schwantes, accepted as Mesembryanthemum grossum Aiton, indigenous
 Nycteranthus pomonae (L.Bolus) Schwantes, accepted as Mesembryanthemum oculatum N.E.Br. indigenous
 Nycteranthus prasinus (L.Bolus) Schwantes, accepted as Mesembryanthemum prasinum (L.Bolus) Klak, indigenous
 Nycteranthus pumilus (L.Bolus) Schwantes, accepted as Mesembryanthemum oubergense (L.Bolus) Klak, indigenous
 Nycteranthus quartziticus (L.Bolus) Schwantes, accepted as Mesembryanthemum quartziticola Klak, indigenous
 Nycteranthus quaternus (L.Bolus) Schwantes, accepted as Mesembryanthemum spinuliferum Haw. indigenous
 Nycteranthus rabiei (L.Bolus) Schwantes, accepted as Mesembryanthemum rabiei (L.Bolus) Klak, endemic
 Nycteranthus radicans (L.Bolus) Schwantes, accepted as Mesembryanthemum rhizophorum Klak, indigenous
 Nycteranthus recurvus (L.Bolus) Schwantes, accepted as Mesembryanthemum sinuosum L.Bolus, indigenous
 Nycteranthus rhodandrus (L.Bolus) Schwantes, accepted as Mesembryanthemum nitidum Haw. indigenous
 Nycteranthus salmoneus (Haw.) Schwantes, accepted as Mesembryanthemum canaliculatum Haw. indigenous
 Nycteranthus saturatus (L.Bolus) Schwantes, accepted as Mesembryanthemum baylissii (L.Bolus) Klak, present
 Nycteranthus scintillans (Dinter) Schwantes, accepted as Mesembryanthemum oculatum N.E.Br. indigenous
 Nycteranthus serotinus (L.Bolus) Schwantes, accepted as Mesembryanthemum serotinum (L.Bolus) Klak, indigenous
 Nycteranthus sinuosus (L.Bolus) Schwantes, accepted as Mesembryanthemum sinuosum L.Bolus, indigenous
 Nycteranthus spinuliferus (Haw.) Schwantes, accepted as Mesembryanthemum spinuliferum Haw. indigenous
 Nycteranthus splendens (L.) Schwantes, accepted as Mesembryanthemum splendens L. subsp. splendens, indigenous
 Nycteranthus stramineus (Haw.) Schwantes, accepted as Mesembryanthemum noctiflorum L. subsp. stramineum (Haw.) Klak, indigenous
 Nycteranthus straminicolor (L.Bolus) Schwantes, accepted as Mesembryanthemum sinuosum L.Bolus, indigenous
 Nycteranthus strictus (L.Bolus) Schwantes, accepted as Mesembryanthemum spinuliferum Haw. indigenous
 Nycteranthus suffusus (L.Bolus) Schwantes, accepted as Mesembryanthemum tetragonum Thunb. indigenous
 Nycteranthus tenuiflorus (Jacq.) Schwantes, accepted as Mesembryanthemum tenuiflorum Jacq. indigenous
 Nycteranthus tetragonus (Thunb.) Schwantes, accepted as Mesembryanthemum tetragonum Thunb. indigenous
 Nycteranthus tetramerus (L.Bolus) Schwantes, accepted as Mesembryanthemum trichotomum Thunb. indigenous
 Nycteranthus tetramerus (L.Bolus) Schwantes var. parviflorus (L.Bolus) Schwantes, accepted as Mesembryanthemum trichotomum Thunb. indigenous
 Nycteranthus trichotomus (Thunb.) Schwantes, accepted as Mesembryanthemum trichotomum Thunb. indigenous
 Nycteranthus varians (L.Bolus) Schwantes, accepted as Mesembryanthemum oculatum N.E.Br. indigenous
 Nycteranthus vespertinus (L.Bolus) Schwantes, accepted as Mesembryanthemum occidentale Klak, indigenous
 Nycteranthus vigilans (L.Bolus) Schwantes, accepted as Mesembryanthemum longistylum DC. indigenous
 Nycteranthus viridiflorus (Aiton) Schwantes, accepted as Mesembryanthemum viridiflorum Aiton, indigenous
 Nycteranthus watermeyeri (L.Bolus) Schwantes, accepted as Mesembryanthemum spinuliferum Haw. indigenous
 Nycteranthus willowmorensis (L.Bolus) Schwantes, accepted as Mesembryanthemum grossum Aiton, indigenous

Octopoma 
Genus Octopoma:
 Octopoma abruptum (A.Berger) N.E.Br. endemic
 Octopoma calycinum (L.Bolus) L.Bolus, accepted as Zeuktophyllum calycinum (L.Bolus) H.E.K.Hartmann, present
 Octopoma conjunctum (L.Bolus) L.Bolus, accepted as Octopoma connatum (L.Bolus) L.Bolus, present
 Octopoma connatum (L.Bolus) L.Bolus, endemic
 Octopoma inclusum (L.Bolus) N.E.Br. endemic
 Octopoma octojuge (L.Bolus) N.E.Br. endemic
 Octopoma quadrisepalum (L.Bolus) H.E.K.Hartmann, endemic
 Octopoma rupigenum (L.Bolus) L.Bolus, endemic
 Octopoma subglobosum (L.Bolus) L.Bolus, endemic
 Octopoma tanquanum Klak, accepted as Octopoma nanum (L.Bolus) Klak, present
 Octopoma tetrasepalum (L.Bolus) H.E.K.Hartmann, endemic

Odontophorus 
Genus Odontophorus:
 Odontophorus angustifolius L.Bolus, indigenous
 Odontophorus angustifolius L.Bolus subsp. angustifolius, endemic
 Odontophorus angustifolius L.Bolus subsp. protoparcoides S.A.Hammer, endemic
 Odontophorus marlothii N.E.Br. endemic
 Odontophorus nanus L.Bolus, endemic
 Odontophorus pusillus S.A.Hammer, endemic

Oophytum 
Genus Oophytum:
 Oophytum nanum (Schltr.) L.Bolus, endemic
 Oophytum oviforme (N.E.Br.) N.E.Br. endemic

Ophthalmophyllum 
Genus Ophthalmophyllum:
 Ophthalmophyllum australe L.Bolus, accepted as Conophytum caroli Lavis, present
 Ophthalmophyllum dinteri Schwantes ex H.Jacobsen, accepted as Conophytum friedrichiae (Dinter) Schwantes
 Ophthalmophyllum fulleri Lavis, accepted as Conophytum longum N.E.Br. present
 Ophthalmophyllum haramoepense L.Bolus, accepted as Conophytum marginatum Lavis subsp. haramoepense (L.Bolus) S.A.Hammer, present
 Ophthalmophyllum herrei Lavis, accepted as Conophytum longum N.E.Br. present
 Ophthalmophyllum latum Tischer forma latum, accepted as Conophytum maughanii N.E.Br. subsp. latum (Tischer) S.A.Hammer, present
 Ophthalmophyllum latum Tischer forma rubrum (Tischer) G.D.Rowley, accepted as Conophytum maughanii N.E.Br. subsp. latum (Tischer) S.A.Hammer, present
 Ophthalmophyllum littlewoodii L.Bolus, accepted as Conophytum devium G.D.Rowley subsp. devium, present
 Ophthalmophyllum longitubum L.Bolus, accepted as Conophytum longum N.E.Br. present
 Ophthalmophyllum longum (N.E.Br.) Tischer, accepted as Conophytum longum N.E.Br. present
 Ophthalmophyllum lydiae H.Jacobsen, accepted as Conophytum lydiae (H.Jacobsen) G.D.Rowley, present
 Ophthalmophyllum maughanii (N.E.Br.) Schwantes, accepted as Conophytum maughanii N.E.Br. subsp. maughanii, present
 Ophthalmophyllum noctiflorum L.Bolus, accepted as Conophytum maughanii N.E.Br. subsp. latum (Tischer) S.A.Hammer, present
 Ophthalmophyllum praesectum (N.E.Br.) Schwantes, accepted as Conophytum praesectum N.E.Br. present
 Ophthalmophyllum pubescens Tischer, accepted as Conophytum pubescens (Tischer) G.D.Rowley, present
 Ophthalmophyllum rufescens (N.E.Br.) Tischer, accepted as Conophytum maughanii N.E.Br. subsp. maughanii, present
 Ophthalmophyllum schlechteri Schwantes, accepted as Conophytum longum N.E.Br. present
 Ophthalmophyllum schuldtii Schwantes, accepted as Conophytum maughanii N.E.Br. subsp. maughanii
 Ophthalmophyllum spathulatum L.Bolus, accepted as Conophytum lydiae (H.Jacobsen) G.D.Rowley, present
 Ophthalmophyllum subfenestratum (Schwantes) Tischer, accepted as Conophytum subfenestratum Schwantes, present
 Ophthalmophyllum triebneri Schwantes, accepted as Conophytum friedrichiae (Dinter) Schwantes$
 Ophthalmophyllum vanheerdei L.Bolus, accepted as Conophytum friedrichiae (Dinter) Schwantes, present
 Ophthalmophyllum verrucosum Lavis, accepted as Conophytum verrucosum (Lavis) G.D.Rowley, present
 Ophthalmophyllum villetii L.Bolus, accepted as Conophytum concordans G.D.Rowley, present

Opophytum 
Genus Opophytum:
 Opophytum ampliatum L.Bolus, accepted as Mesembryanthemum hypertrophicum Dinter, present
 Opophytum australe L.Bolus, accepted as Mesembryanthemum hypertrophicum Dinter, present
 Opophytum cryptanthum (Hook.f.) Gerbaulet, accepted as Mesembryanthemum cryptanthum Hook.f. indigenous
 Opophytum fastigiatum (Thunb.) N.E.Br. accepted as Mesembryanthemum fastigiatum Thunb. indigenous
 Opophytum hypertrophicum (Dinter) Gerbaulet, accepted as Mesembryanthemum hypertrophicum Dinter, indigenous

Orthopterum 
Genus Orthopterum:
 Orthopterum coegana L.Bolus, endemic
 Orthopterum waltoniae L.Bolus, endemic

Oscularia 
Genus Oscularia:
 Oscularia alba (L.Bolus) H.E.K.Hartmann, endemic
 Oscularia caulescens (Mill.) Schwantes, endemic
 Oscularia cedarbergensis (L.Bolus) H.E.K.Hartmann, endemic
 Oscularia compressa (L.Bolus) H.E.K.Hartmann, endemic
 Oscularia comptonii (L.Bolus) H.E.K.Hartmann, endemic
 Oscularia copiosa (L.Bolus) H.E.K.Hartmann, endemic
 Oscularia cremnophila Van Jaarsv. Desmet & A.E.van Wyk, endemic
 Oscularia deltoides (L.) Schwantes, endemic
 Oscularia deltoides (L.) Schwantes var. major (Weston) Schwantes, accepted as Oscularia major (Weston) Schwantes, present
 Oscularia excedens (L.Bolus) H.E.K.Hartmann, endemic
 Oscularia falciformis (Haw.) H.E.K.Hartmann, accepted as Lampranthus falciformis (Haw.) N.E.Br. present
 Oscularia guthriae (L.Bolus) H.E.K.Hartmann, endemic
 Oscularia lunata (Willd.) H.E.K.Hartmann, endemic
 Oscularia major (Weston) Schwantes, endemic
 Oscularia ornata (L.Bolus) H.E.K.Hartmann, endemic
 Oscularia paardebergensis (L.Bolus) H.E.K.Hartmann, endemic
 Oscularia pedunculata (N.E.Br.) Schwantes, endemic
 Oscularia piquetbergensis (L.Bolus) H.E.K.Hartmann, endemic
 Oscularia prasina (L.Bolus) H.E.K.Hartmann, endemic
 Oscularia primiverna (L.Bolus) H.E.K.Hartmann, endemic
 Oscularia steenbergensis (L.Bolus) H.E.K.Hartmann, endemic
 Oscularia superans (L.Bolus) H.E.K.Hartmann, endemic
 Oscularia thermarum (L.Bolus) H.E.K.Hartmann, endemic
 Oscularia vernicolor (L.Bolus) H.E.K.Hartmann, endemic
 Oscularia vredenburgensis (L.Bolus) H.E.K.Hartmann, endemic

Ottosonderia 
Genus Ottosonderia:
 Ottosonderia monticola (Sond.) L.Bolus, endemic
 Ottosonderia obtusa L.Bolus, accepted as Ottosonderia monticola (Sond.) L.Bolus, endemic

Peersia 
Genus Peersia:
 Peersia frithii (L.Bolus) L.Bolus, endemic
 Peersia macradenia (L.Bolus) L.Bolus, endemic
 Peersia vanheerdei (L.Bolus) H.E.K.Hartmann, endemic

Pentacoilanthus 
Genus Pentacoilanthus:
 Pentacoilanthus aitonis (Jacq.) Rappa & Camarrone, accepted as Mesembryanthemum aitonis Jacq. indigenous
 Pentacoilanthus crassicaulis (Haw.) Rappa & Camarrone, accepted as Mesembryanthemum crassicaule Haw. indigenous
 Pentacoilanthus crystallinus (L.) Rappa & Camorrone, accepted as Mesembryanthemum crystallinum L. indigenous
 Pentacoilanthus expansus (L.) Rappa & Camorrone, accepted as Mesembryanthemum expansum L. indigenous
 Pentacoilanthus granulicaulis (Haw.) Rappa & Camarrone, accepted as Mesembryanthemum granulicaule Haw. indigenous
 Pentacoilanthus splendens (L.) Rappa & Camorrone, accepted as Mesembryanthemum splendens L. subsp. splendens, present
 Pentacoilanthus tortuosus (L.) Rappa & Camorrone, accepted as Mesembryanthemum tortuosum L. indigenous

Perapentacoilanthus 
Genus Perapentacoilanthus:
 Perapentacoilanthus aitonis (Jacq.) Rappa & Camarrone, accepted as Mesembryanthemum aitonis Jacq. indigenous
 Perapentacoilanthus crystallinus (L.) Rappa & Camorrone, accepted as Mesembryanthemum crystallinum L. indigenous
 Perapentacoilanthus delus (L.Bolus) Rappa & Camarrone, accepted as Mesembryanthemum delum L.Bolus, indigenous
 Perapentacoilanthus fastigiatus (Thunb.) Rappa & Camorrone, accepted as Mesembryanthemum fastigiatum Thunb. indigenous
 Perapentacoilanthus granulicaulis (Haw.) Rappa & Camarrone, accepted as Mesembryanthemum granulicaule Haw. indigenous
 Perapentacoilanthus grossus (Aiton) Rappa & Camarrone, accepted as Mesembryanthemum grossum Aiton, indigenous
 Perapentacoilanthus longispinulus (Haw.) Rappa & Camarrone, accepted as Mesembryanthemum grossum Aiton, indigenous
 Perapentacoilanthus scintillans (Dinter) Rappa & Camorrone, accepted as Mesembryanthemum oculatum N.E.Br. indigenous
 Perapentacoilanthus spinuliferus (Haw.) Rappa & Camarrone, accepted as Mesembryanthemum spinuliferum Haw. indigenous
 Perapentacoilanthus vanrensburgii (L.Bolus) Rappa & Camarrone, accepted as Mesembryanthemum vanrensburgii (L.Bolus) Klak, indigenous
 Perapentacoilanthus viridiflorus (Aiton) Rappa & Camarrone, accepted as Mesembryanthemum viridiflorum Aiton, indigenous

Peratetracoilanthus 
Genus Peratetracoilanthus:
 Peratetracoilanthus defoliatus (Haw.) Rappa & Camarrone, accepted as Mesembryanthemum noctiflorum L. subsp. defoliatum (Haw.) Klak, indigenous
 Peratetracoilanthus geniculiflorus (L.) Rappa & Camorrone, accepted as Mesembryanthemum geniculiflorum L. indigenous
 Peratetracoilanthus haeckelianus (A.Berger) Rappa & Camarrone, accepted as Mesembryanthemum haeckelianum A.Berger, indigenous
 Peratetracoilanthus junceus (Haw.) Rappa & Camarrone, accepted as Mesembryanthemum junceum Haw. indigenous
 Peratetracoilanthus noctiflorus (L.) Rappa & Camorrone, accepted as Mesembryanthemum noctiflorum L. subsp. noctiflorum, indigenous
 Peratetracoilanthus parviflorus (Jacq.) Rappa & Camarrone, accepted as Mesembryanthemum parviflorum Jacq. indigenous
 Peratetracoilanthus tetragonus (Thunb.) Rappa & Camorrone, accepted as Mesembryanthemum tetragonum Thunb. indigenous

Phiambolia 
Genus Phiambolia:
 Phiambolia franciscii (L.Bolus) Klak, endemic
 Phiambolia gydouwensis (L.Bolus) Klak, endemic
 Phiambolia hallii (L.Bolus) Klak, endemic
 Phiambolia incumbens (L.Bolus) Klak, endemic
 Phiambolia littlewoodii (L.Bolus) Klak, endemic
 Phiambolia longifolia Klak, endemic
 Phiambolia mentiens Klak, endemic
 Phiambolia persistens (L.Bolus) Klak, endemic
 Phiambolia similis Klak, endemic
 Phiambolia stayneri (L.Bolus ex Toelken & Jessop) Klak, accepted as Phiambolia littlewoodii (L.Bolus) Klak, endemic
 Phiambolia unca (L.Bolus) Klak, endemic

Phyllobolus 
Genus Phyllobolus:
 Phyllobolus abbreviatus (L.Bolus) Gerbaulet, accepted as Mesembryanthemum lilliputanum Klak, endemic
 Phyllobolus amabilis Gerbaulet & Struck, accepted as Mesembryanthemum amabile (Gerbaulet & Struck) Klak, endemic
 Phyllobolus bulletrapensis (Klak) Gerbaulet, accepted as Mesembryanthemum bulletrapense Klak, endemic
 Phyllobolus canaliculatus (Haw.) Bittrich, accepted as Mesembryanthemum canaliculatum Haw. endemic
 Phyllobolus caudatus (L.Bolus) Gerbaulet, accepted as Mesembryanthemum caudatum L.Bolus, endemic
 Phyllobolus chrysophthalmus Gerbaulet & Struck, accepted as Mesembryanthemum chrysophthalmum (Gerbaulet & Struck) Klak, endemic
 Phyllobolus congestus (L.Bolus) Gerbaulet, accepted as Mesembryanthemum flavidum Klak, endemic
 Phyllobolus deciduus (L.Bolus) Gerbaulet, accepted as Mesembryanthemum deciduum (L.Bolus) Klak, endemic
 Phyllobolus decurvatus (L.Bolus) Gerbaulet, accepted as Mesembryanthemum decurvatum (L.Bolus) Klak, endemic
 Phyllobolus delus (L.Bolus) Gerbaulet, accepted as Mesembryanthemum delum L.Bolus, endemic
 Phyllobolus digitatus (Aiton) Gerbaulet, accepted as Mesembryanthemum digitatum Aiton subsp. digitatum, indigenous
 Phyllobolus digitatus (Aiton) Gerbaulet subsp. littlewoodii (L.Bolus) Gerbaulet, accepted as Mesembryanthemum digitatum Aiton subsp. littlewoodii (L.Bolus) Klak, indigenous
 Phyllobolus gariepensis Gerbaulet & Struck, accepted as Mesembryanthemum gariepense (Gerbaulet & Struck) Klak, endemic
 Phyllobolus grossus (Aiton) Gerbaulet, accepted as Mesembryanthemum grossum Aiton, endemic
 Phyllobolus herbertii (N.E.Br.) Gerbaulet, accepted as Mesembryanthemum lilliputanum Klak, endemic
 Phyllobolus humilis (L.Bolus) Klak, accepted as Mesembryanthemum holense Klak, endemic
 Phyllobolus latipetalus (L.Bolus) Gerbaulet, accepted as Mesembryanthemum latipetalum (L.Bolus) Klak, endemic
 Phyllobolus lesliei N.E.Br. accepted as Mesembryanthemum resurgens Kensit, indigenous
 Phyllobolus lignescens (L.Bolus) Gerbaulet, accepted as Mesembryanthemum lignescens (L.Bolus) Klak, indigenous
 Phyllobolus melanospermus (Dinter & Schwantes) Gerbaulet, accepted as Mesembryanthemum ligneum (L.Bolus) Klak, indigenous
 Phyllobolus nitidus (Haw.) Gerbaulet, accepted as Mesembryanthemum nitidum Haw. endemic
 Phyllobolus noctiflorus (L.) Bittrich, accepted as Mesembryanthemum noctiflorum L. subsp. noctiflorum, indigenous
 Phyllobolus oculatus (N.E.Br.) Gerbaulet, accepted as Mesembryanthemum oculatum N.E.Br. indigenous
 Phyllobolus pallens (Aiton) Bittrich, accepted as Mesembryanthemum pallens Aiton subsp. pallens, indigenous
 Phyllobolus pearsonii N.E.Br. ex S.A.Hammer, accepted as Mesembryanthemum resurgens Kensit, indigenous
 Phyllobolus prasinus (L.Bolus) Gerbaulet, accepted as Mesembryanthemum prasinum (L.Bolus) Klak, endemic
 Phyllobolus publicalyx N.E.Br. accepted as Mesembryanthemum resurgens Kensit, indigenous
 Phyllobolus pumilus (L.Bolus) Gerbaulet, accepted as Mesembryanthemum oubergense (L.Bolus) Klak, endemic
 Phyllobolus quartziticus (L.Bolus) Gerbaulet, accepted as Mesembryanthemum quartziticola Klak, endemic
 Phyllobolus rabiei (L.Bolus) Gerbaulet, accepted as Mesembryanthemum rabiei (L.Bolus) Klak, endemic
 Phyllobolus resurgens (Kensit) Schwantes, accepted as Mesembryanthemum resurgens Kensit, endemic
 Phyllobolus roseus (L.Bolus) Gerbaulet, accepted as Mesembryanthemum vanheerdei (L.Bolus) Klak, endemic
 Phyllobolus saturatus (L.Bolus) Gerbaulet, accepted as Mesembryanthemum baylissii (L.Bolus) Klak, endemic
 Phyllobolus sinuosus (L.Bolus) Gerbaulet, accepted as Mesembryanthemum sinuosum L.Bolus, endemic
 Phyllobolus spinuliferus (Haw.) Gerbaulet, accepted as Mesembryanthemum spinuliferum Haw. endemic
 Phyllobolus splendens (L.) Gerbaulet, accepted as Mesembryanthemum splendens L. subsp. splendens, indigenous
 Phyllobolus splendens (L.) Gerbaulet subsp. pentagonus (L.Bolus) Gerbaulet, accepted as Mesembryanthemum splendens L. subsp. pentagonum (L.Bolus) Klak, endemic
 Phyllobolus suffruticosus (L.Bolus) Gerbaulet, accepted as Mesembryanthemum suffruticosum (L.Bolus) Klak, endemic
 Phyllobolus tenuiflorus (Jacq.) Gerbaulet, accepted as Mesembryanthemum tenuiflorum Jacq. endemic
 Phyllobolus tortuosus (L.) Bittrich, accepted as Mesembryanthemum tortuosum L. indigenous
 Phyllobolus trichotomus (Thunb.) Gerbaulet, accepted as Mesembryanthemum trichotomum Thunb. endemic
 Phyllobolus viridiflorus (Aiton) Gerbaulet, accepted as Mesembryanthemum viridiflorum Aiton, endemic

Platythyra 
Genus Platythyra:
 Platythyra barklyi (N.E.Br.) Schwantes, accepted as Mesembryanthemum barklyi N.E.Br. indigenous
 Platythyra haeckeliana (A.Berger) N.E.Br. accepted as Mesembryanthemum haeckelianum A.Berger, indigenous
 Platythyra pallens (Aiton) L.Bolus, accepted as Mesembryanthemum pallens Aiton subsp. pallens, indigenous
 Platythyra relaxata (Willd.) Schwantes, accepted as Mesembryanthemum pallens Aiton subsp. pallens, present

Pleiospilos 
Genus Pleiospilos:
 Pleiospilos bolusii (Hook.f.) N.E.Br. endemic
 Pleiospilos compactus (Aiton) Schwantes, indigenous
 Pleiospilos compactus (Aiton) Schwantes subsp. canus (Haw.) H.E.K.Hartmann & Liede, endemic
 Pleiospilos compactus (Aiton) Schwantes subsp. compactus, endemic
 Pleiospilos compactus (Aiton) Schwantes subsp. fergusoniae (L.Bolus) H.E.K.Hartmann & Liede, endemic
 Pleiospilos compactus (Aiton) Schwantes subsp. minor (L.Bolus) H.E.K.Hartmann & Liede, endemic
 Pleiospilos compactus (Aiton) Schwantes subsp. sororius (N.E.Br.) H.E.K.Hartmann & Liede, endemic
 Pleiospilos nelii Schwantes, endemic
 Pleiospilos simulans (Marloth) N.E.Br. endemic

Plinthus 
Genus Plinthus:
 Plinthus arenarius Adamson, indigenous
 Plinthus cryptocarpus Fenzl, indigenous
 Plinthus karooicus I.Verd. indigenous
 Plinthus rehmannii G.Schellenb. endemic
 Plinthus sericeus Pax, indigenous

Polymita 
Genus Polymita:
 Polymita albiflora (L.Bolus) L.Bolus, endemic
 Polymita diutina (L.Bolus) L.Bolus, accepted as Polymita albiflora (L.Bolus) L.Bolus, present
 Polymita steenbokensis H.E.K.Hartmann, endemic

Prenia 
Genus Prenia:
 Prenia englishiae (L.Bolus) Gerbaulet, accepted as Mesembryanthemum englishiae L.Bolus, endemic
 Prenia olivacea (Schltr.) H.Jacobsen, accepted as Mesembryanthemum tenuiflorum Jacq. indigenous
 Prenia pallens (Aiton) N.E.Br. accepted as Mesembryanthemum pallens Aiton subsp. pallens, indigenous
 Prenia pallens (Aiton) N.E.Br. subsp. lancea (Thunb.) Gerbaulet, accepted as Mesembryanthemum pallens Aiton subsp. lanceum (Thunb.) Klak, endemic
 Prenia pallens (Aiton) N.E.Br. subsp. namaquensis Gerbaulet, accepted as Mesembryanthemum pallens Aiton subsp. namaquense (Gerbaulet) Klak, endemic
 Prenia pallens (Aiton) N.E.Br. var. lutea L.Bolus, accepted as Mesembryanthemum pallens Aiton subsp. luteum (L.Bolus) Klak, endemic
 Prenia radicans (L.Bolus) Gerbaulet, accepted as Mesembryanthemum rhizophorum Klak, endemic
 Prenia relaxata (Willd.) N.E.Br. accepted as Mesembryanthemum pallens Aiton subsp. pallens, present
 Prenia sladeniana (L.Bolus) L.Bolus, accepted as Mesembryanthemum sladenianum L.Bolus, indigenous
 Prenia tetragona (Thunb.) Gerbaulet, accepted as Mesembryanthemum tetragonum Thunb. indigenous
 Prenia vanrensburgii L.Bolus, accepted as Mesembryanthemum vanrensburgii (L.Bolus) Klak, endemic

Prepodesma 
Genus Prepodesma:
 Prepodesma orpenii (N.E.Br.) N.E.Br. endemic

Psammophora 
Genus Psammophora:
 Psammophora herrei L.Bolus, accepted as Psammophora longifolia L.Bolus
 Psammophora longifolia L.Bolus, indigenous
 Psammophora modesta (Dinter & A.Berger) Dinter & Schwantes, indigenous

Pseudobrownanthus 
Genus Pseudobrownanthus:
 Pseudobrownanthus nucifer Ihlenf. & Bittrich, accepted as Mesembryanthemum nucifer (Ihlenf. & Bittrich) Klak, indigenous

Psilocaulon 
Genus Psilocaulon:
 Psilocaulon absimile N.E.Br. accepted as Mesembryanthemum coriarium Burch. ex N.E.Br. present
 Psilocaulon acutisepalum (A.Berger) N.E.Br. accepted as Mesembryanthemum junceum Haw. present
 Psilocaulon album L.Bolus, accepted as Mesembryanthemum leptarthron A.Berger, present
 Psilocaulon annuum L.Bolus, accepted as Mesembryanthemum articulatum Thunb. present
 Psilocaulon arenosum (Schinz) L.Bolus, accepted as Mesembryanthemum arenosum Schinz, indigenous
 Psilocaulon articulatum (Thunb.) N.E.Br. accepted as Mesembryanthemum articulatum Thunb. indigenous
 Psilocaulon baylissii L.Bolus, accepted as Mesembryanthemum dinteri Engl. present
 Psilocaulon bicorne (Sond.) Schwantes, accepted as Mesembryanthemum bicorne Sond. endemic
 Psilocaulon bryantii L.Bolus, accepted as Mesembryanthemum articulatum Thunb. present
 Psilocaulon calvinianum L.Bolus, accepted as Mesembryanthemum junceum Haw. present
 Psilocaulon candidum L.Bolus, accepted as Mesembryanthemum junceum Haw. present
 Psilocaulon clavulatum (A.Berger) N.E.Br. accepted as Mesembryanthemum subnodosum A.Berger
 Psilocaulon corallinum (Thunb.) Schwantes, accepted as Mesembryanthemum corallinum Thunb. indigenous
 Psilocaulon coriarium (Burch. ex N.E.Br.) N.E.Br. accepted as Mesembryanthemum coriarium Burch. ex N.E.Br. indigenous
 Psilocaulon dejagerae L.Bolus, accepted as Mesembryanthemum articulatum Thunb. present
 Psilocaulon delosepalum L.Bolus, accepted as Mesembryanthemum junceum Haw. present
 Psilocaulon densum N.E.Br. endemic
 Psilocaulon dinteri (Engl.) Schwantes, accepted as Mesembryanthemum dinteri Engl. indigenous
 Psilocaulon duthiae L.Bolus, accepted as Mesembryanthemum articulatum Thunb. present
 Psilocaulon filipetalum L.Bolus, accepted as Mesembryanthemum subnodosum A.Berger, present
 Psilocaulon fimbriatum L.Bolus, accepted as Mesembryanthemum salicornioides Pax
 Psilocaulon foliosum L.Bolus, accepted as Mesembryanthemum neofoliosum Klak, endemic
 Psilocaulon framesii L.Bolus, accepted as Mesembryanthemum junceum Haw. present
 Psilocaulon glareosum (A.Berger) Dinter & Schwantes, accepted as Mesembryanthemum salicornioides Pax, present
 Psilocaulon godmaniae L.Bolus, accepted as Mesembryanthemum dinteri Engl. indigenous
 Psilocaulon godmaniae L.Bolus var. gracile L.Bolus, accepted as Mesembryanthemum dinteri Engl. present
 Psilocaulon granulicaule (Haw.) Schwantes, accepted as Mesembryanthemum granulicaule Haw. indigenous
 Psilocaulon herrei L.Bolus, accepted as Mesembryanthemum dinteri Engl. present
 Psilocaulon hirtellum L.Bolus, accepted as Mesembryanthemum articulatum Thunb. present
 Psilocaulon imitans L.Bolus, accepted as Mesembryanthemum junceum Haw. present
 Psilocaulon implexum N.E.Br. accepted as Mesembryanthemum parviflorum Jacq. present
 Psilocaulon inconstrictum L.Bolus, accepted as Mesembryanthemum subnodosum A.Berger, present
 Psilocaulon junceum (Haw.) Schwantes, accepted as Mesembryanthemum junceum Haw. endemic
 Psilocaulon laxiflorum L.Bolus, accepted as Mesembryanthemum junceum Haw. present
 Psilocaulon leightoniae L.Bolus, accepted as Mesembryanthemum junceum Haw. present
 Psilocaulon leptarthron (A.Berger) N.E.Br. accepted as Mesembryanthemum leptarthron A.Berger, endemic
 Psilocaulon levynsiae N.E.Br. accepted as Mesembryanthemum junceum Haw. present
 Psilocaulon lewisiae L.Bolus, accepted as Mesembryanthemum junceum Haw. present
 Psilocaulon liebenbergii L.Bolus, accepted as Mesembryanthemum articulatum Thunb. present
 Psilocaulon lindequistii (Engl.) Schwantes, accepted as Mesembryanthemum noctiflorum L. subsp. noctiflorum
 Psilocaulon littlewoodii L.Bolus, accepted as Mesembryanthemum dinteri Engl. present
 Psilocaulon longipes L.Bolus, accepted as Mesembryanthemum rapaceum Jacq. present
 Psilocaulon marlothii (Pax) Friedrich, accepted as Mesembryanthemum marlothii Pax, indigenous
 Psilocaulon melanospermum (A.Berger) N.E.Br. accepted as Mesembryanthemum geniculiflorum L. indigenous
 Psilocaulon mentiens (A.Berger) N.E.Br. accepted as Mesembryanthemum coriarium Burch. ex N.E.Br. present
 Psilocaulon mucronulatum (Dinter) N.E.Br. accepted as Mesembryanthemum articulatum Thunb. present
 Psilocaulon oculatum L.Bolus, accepted as Mesembryanthemum junceum Haw. present
 Psilocaulon pageae L.Bolus, accepted as Mesembryanthemum dinteri Engl. indigenous
 Psilocaulon pageae L.Bolus var. grandiflorum L.Bolus, accepted as Mesembryanthemum dinteri Engl. present
 Psilocaulon parviflorum (Jacq.) Schwantes, accepted as Mesembryanthemum parviflorum Jacq. indigenous
 Psilocaulon pauper L.Bolus, accepted as Mesembryanthemum granulicaule Haw. present
 Psilocaulon peersii L.Bolus, accepted as Mesembryanthemum corallinum Thunb. present
 Psilocaulon pfeilii (Engl.) Schwantes, accepted as Mesembryanthemum tetragonum Thunb. present
 Psilocaulon planisepalum L.Bolus, accepted as Mesembryanthemum junceum Haw. present
 Psilocaulon pomeridianum L.Bolus, accepted as Mesembryanthemum stenandrum (L.Bolus) L.Bolus, present
 Psilocaulon rapaceum (Jacq.) Schwantes, accepted as Mesembryanthemum rapaceum Jacq. indigenous
 Psilocaulon rogersiae L.Bolus, accepted as Mesembryanthemum junceum Haw. present
 Psilocaulon roseoalbum L.Bolus, accepted as Mesembryanthemum articulatum Thunb. present
 Psilocaulon salicornioides (Pax) Schwantes, accepted as Mesembryanthemum salicornioides Pax, indigenous
 Psilocaulon schlichtianum (Sond.) Schwantes, accepted as Mesembryanthemum arenosum Schinz, indigenous
 Psilocaulon semilunatum L.Bolus, accepted as Mesembryanthemum junceum Haw. present
 Psilocaulon simile (Sond.) Schwantes, accepted as Mesembryanthemum junceum Haw. present
 Psilocaulon stayneri L.Bolus, accepted as Mesembryanthemum junceum Haw. present
 Psilocaulon subintegrum L.Bolus, accepted as Mesembryanthemum junceum Haw. present
 Psilocaulon subnodosum (A.Berger) N.E.Br. accepted as Mesembryanthemum subnodosum A.Berger, indigenous
 Psilocaulon tenue (Haw.) Schwantes, accepted as Mesembryanthemum parviflorum Jacq. present
 Psilocaulon uncinatum L.Bolus, accepted as Mesembryanthemum coriarium Burch. ex N.E.Br.
 Psilocaulon utile L.Bolus, accepted as Mesembryanthemum junceum Haw. present
 Psilocaulon variabile L.Bolus, accepted as Mesembryanthemum dinteri Engl. present

Pteropentacoilanthus 
Genus Pteropentacoilanthus:
 Pteropentacoilanthus fastigiatus (Dinter) Rappa & Camorrone, accepted as Mesembryanthemum fastigiatum Thunb. indigenous
 Pteropentacoilanthus hypertrophicus (Dinter) Rappa & Camorrone, accepted as Mesembryanthemum hypertrophicum Dinter, indigenous

Rabiea 
Genus Rabiea:
 Rabiea albinota (Haw.) N.E.Br. indigenous
 Rabiea albinota (Haw.) N.E.Br. var. longipetala L.Bolus, accepted as Rabiea albinota (Haw.) N.E.Br. present
 Rabiea albinota (Haw.) N.E.Br. var. microstigma L.Bolus, accepted as Rabiea albinota (Haw.) N.E.Br. present
 Rabiea albipuncta (Haw.) N.E.Br. endemic
 Rabiea albipuncta (Haw.) N.E.Br. var. major L.Bolus, accepted as Rabiea albipuncta (Haw.) N.E.Br. present
 Rabiea comptonii (L.Bolus) L.Bolus, endemic
 Rabiea difformis (L.Bolus) L.Bolus, endemic
 Rabiea jamesii (L.Bolus) L.Bolus, endemic
 Rabiea lesliei N.E.Br. indigenous
 Rabiea tersa N.E.Br. accepted as Prepodesma orpenii (N.E.Br.) N.E.Br. present

Rhinephyllum 
Genus Rhinephyllum:
 Rhinephyllum broomii L.Bolus, endemic
 Rhinephyllum comptonii L.Bolus, endemic
 Rhinephyllum frithii (L.Bolus) L.Bolus, accepted as Peersia frithii (L.Bolus) L.Bolus, present
 Rhinephyllum graniforme (Haw.) L.Bolus, endemic
 Rhinephyllum inaequale L.Bolus, endemic
 Rhinephyllum inaequale L.Bolus var. latipetalum L.Bolus, accepted as Rhinephyllum inaequale L.Bolus, present
 Rhinephyllum luteum (L.Bolus) L.Bolus, endemic
 Rhinephyllum macradenium (L.Bolus) L.Bolus, accepted as Peersia macradenia (L.Bolus) L.Bolus, present
 Rhinephyllum muirii N.E.Br. endemic
 Rhinephyllum obliquum L.Bolus, endemic
 Rhinephyllum parvifolium L.Bolus, endemic
 Rhinephyllum pillansii N.E.Br. endemic
 Rhinephyllum rouxii (L.Bolus) L.Bolus, accepted as Chasmatophyllum rouxii L.Bolus, present
 Rhinephyllum schonlandii L.Bolus, endemic
 Rhinephyllum vanheerdei L.Bolus, accepted as Peersia vanheerdei (L.Bolus) H.E.K.Hartmann, present

Rhombophyllum 
Genus Rhombophyllum:
 Rhombophyllum albanense (L.Bolus) H.E.K.Hartmann, endemic
 Rhombophyllum dolabriforme (L.) Schwantes, endemic
 Rhombophyllum dyeri (L.Bolus) H.E.K.Hartmann, endemic
 Rhombophyllum nelii Schwantes, endemic
 Rhombophyllum rhomboideum (Salm-Dyck) Schwantes, endemic
 Rhombophyllum rhomboideum (Salm-Dyck) Schwantes var. groppiorum Heinrich, accepted as Rhombophyllum rhomboideum (Salm-Dyck) Schwantes, present

Roosia 
Genus Roosia:
 Roosia grahambeckii (Van Jaarsv.) Van Jaarsv. endemic
 Roosia lucilleae (Van Jaarsv.) Van Jaarsv. endemic

Ruschia 
Genus Ruschia:
 Ruschia abbreviata L.Bolus, indigenous
 Ruschia acocksii L.Bolus, endemic
 Ruschia acuminata L.Bolus, endemic
 Ruschia acutangula (Haw.) Schwantes, endemic
 Ruschia addita L.Bolus, accepted as Antimima addita (L.Bolus) H.E.K.Hartmann, present
 Ruschia aggregata L.Bolus, endemic
 Ruschia alata L.Bolus, endemic
 Ruschia albertensis L.Bolus, accepted as Ruschia spinosa (L.) Dehn, present
 Ruschia albida Klak, endemic
 Ruschia alborubra L.Bolus, accepted as Antimima alborubra (L.Bolus) Dehn, present
 Ruschia altigena (L.Bolus) L.Bolus, endemic
 Ruschia amicorum (L.Bolus) Schwantes, endemic
 Ruschia amoena Schwantes, accepted as Antimima amoena (Schwantes) H.E.K.Hartmann, present
 Ruschia ampliata L.Bolus, endemic
 Ruschia androsacea Marloth & Schwantes, accepted as Antimima androsacea (Marloth & Schwantes) H.E.K.Hartmann, present
 Ruschia approximata (L.Bolus) Schwantes, endemic
 Ruschia archeri L.Bolus, endemic
 Ruschia archeri L.Bolus var. sexpartita L.Bolus, accepted as Ruschia archeri L.Bolus, present
 Ruschia arenosa L.Bolus, accepted as Ruschiella lunulata (A.Berger) Klak, present
 Ruschia aristata L.Bolus, accepted as Erepsia aristata (L.Bolus) Liede & H.E.K.Hartmann, present
 Ruschia aristulata (Sond.) Schwantes, accepted as Antimima aristulata (Sond.) Chess. & Gideon F.Sm. indigenous
 Ruschia armata L.Bolus, accepted as Arenifera stylosa (L.Bolus) H.E.K.Hartmann, present
 Ruschia aspera L.Bolus, endemic
 Ruschia atrata L.Bolus, endemic
 Ruschia barnardii L.Bolus, indigenous
 Ruschia beaufortensis L.Bolus, endemic
 Ruschia bicolorata L.Bolus, accepted as Stoeberia beetzii (Dinter) Dinter & Schwantes, present
 Ruschia biformis (N.E.Br.) Schwantes, accepted as Antimima biformis (N.E.Br.) H.E.K.Hartmann, present
 Ruschia bijliae L.Bolus, endemic
 Ruschia bina L.Bolus, accepted as Antimima viatorum (L.Bolus) Klak, present
 Ruschia bipapillata L.Bolus, endemic
 Ruschia bolusiae Schwantes, endemic
 Ruschia bracteata L.Bolus, accepted as Antimima bracteata (L.Bolus) H.E.K.Hartmann, present
 Ruschia brakdamensis (L.Bolus) L.Bolus, endemic
 Ruschia breekpoortensis L.Bolus, endemic
 Ruschia brevibracteata L.Bolus, endemic
 Ruschia brevicarpa L.Bolus, accepted as Antimima brevicarpa (L.Bolus) H.E.K.Hartmann, present
 Ruschia brevicollis (N.E.Br.) Schwantes, accepted as Antimima brevicollis (N.E.Br.) H.E.K.Hartmann, present
 Ruschia brevicyma L.Bolus, endemic
 Ruschia brevifolia L.Bolus, endemic
 Ruschia brevipes L.Bolus, endemic
 Ruschia brevipes L.Bolus var. gracilis L.Bolus, accepted as Ruschia brevipes L.Bolus, present
 Ruschia britteniae L.Bolus, endemic
 Ruschia burtoniae L.Bolus, endemic
 Ruschia calcarea L.Bolus, endemic
 Ruschia calcicola (L.Bolus) L.Bolus, endemic
 Ruschia callifera L.Bolus, endemic
 Ruschia campestris (Burch.) Schwantes, endemic
 Ruschia canonotata (L.Bolus) Schwantes, indigenous
 Ruschia capornii (L.Bolus) L.Bolus, endemic
 Ruschia caroli (L.Bolus) Schwantes, endemic
 Ruschia caudata L.Bolus, accepted as Ruschia tumidula (Haw.) Schwantes, endemic
 Ruschia cedarbergensis L.Bolus, endemic
 Ruschia centrocapsula H.E.K.Hartmann & Stuber, endemic
 Ruschia ceresiana L.Bolus, endemic
 Ruschia ceresiana Schwantes, accepted as Ruschia ceresiana L.Bolus, present
 Ruschia cincta (L.Bolus) L.Bolus, endemic
 Ruschia clavata L.Bolus, endemic
 Ruschia cleista L.Bolus, accepted as Eberlanzia sedoides (Dinter & A.Berger) Schwantes, present
 Ruschia compacta L.Bolus, accepted as Antimima compacta (L.Bolus) H.E.K.Hartmann, present
 Ruschia complanata L.Bolus, endemic
 Ruschia compressa L.Bolus, accepted as Antimima compressa (L.Bolus) H.E.K.Hartmann, present
 Ruschia concava L.Bolus, accepted as Antimima dasyphylla (Schltr.) H.E.K.Hartmann, present
 Ruschia concinna L.Bolus, accepted as Antimima aristulata (Sond.) Chess. & Gideon F.Sm. indigenous
 Ruschia condensa (N.E.Br.) Schwantes, accepted as Antimima condensa (N.E.Br.) H.E.K.Hartmann, present
 Ruschia congesta (Salm-Dyck) L.Bolus, endemic
 Ruschia copiosa L.Bolus, endemic
 Ruschia coriaria (Burch. ex N.E.Br.) Schwantes, accepted as Mesembryanthemum coriarium Burch. ex N.E.Br. indigenous
 Ruschia costata L.Bolus, endemic
 Ruschia cradockensis (Kuntze) H.E.K.Hartmann & Stuber, indigenous
 Ruschia cradockensis (Kuntze) H.E.K.Hartmann & Stuber subsp. cradockensis, endemic
 Ruschia cradockensis (Kuntze) H.E.K.Hartmann & Stuber subsp. triticiformis (L.Bolus) H.E.K.Hartmann, indigenous
 Ruschia crassa (L.Bolus) Schwantes, endemic
 Ruschia crassifolia L.Bolus, accepted as Antimima paripetala (L.Bolus) Klak, present
 Ruschia crassisepala L.Bolus, endemic
 Ruschia crassisepala L.Bolus var. major L.Bolus, accepted as Ruschia crassisepala L.Bolus, present
 Ruschia crassuloides L.Bolus, accepted as Eberlanzia sedoides (Dinter & A.Berger) Schwantes, present
 Ruschia cupulata (L.Bolus) Schwantes, endemic
 Ruschia curta (Haw.) Schwantes, endemic
 Ruschia cyathiformis L.Bolus, accepted as Eberlanzia cyathiformis (L.Bolus) H.E.K.Hartmann, present
 Ruschia cymbifolia (Haw.) L.Bolus, endemic
 Ruschia cymosa (L.Bolus) Schwantes, accepted as Ruschia pungens (A.Berger) H.Jacobsen, endemic
 Ruschia dasyphylla (Schltr.) Schwantes, accepted as Antimima dasyphylla (Schltr.) H.E.K.Hartmann, present
 Ruschia decumbens L.Bolus, endemic
 Ruschia decurrens L.Bolus, endemic
 Ruschia decurvans L.Bolus, endemic
 Ruschia deflecta L.Bolus, accepted as Antimima defecta (L.Bolus) H.E.K.Hartmann, present
 Ruschia dejagerae L.Bolus, endemic
 Ruschia dekenahii (N.E.Br.) Schwantes, accepted as Antimima dekenahi (N.E.Br.) H.E.K.Hartmann, present
 Ruschia densiflora L.Bolus, endemic
 Ruschia depressa L.Bolus, endemic
 Ruschia dichotoma L.Bolus, accepted as Eberlanzia dichotoma (L.Bolus) H.E.K.Hartmann, present
 Ruschia dichroa (Rolfe) L.Bolus, endemic
 Ruschia dichroa (Rolfe) L.Bolus var. alba L.Bolus, accepted as Ruschia dichroa (Rolfe) L.Bolus, present
 Ruschia dilatata L.Bolus, endemic
 Ruschia distans (L.Bolus) L.Bolus, accepted as Antimima distans (L.Bolus) H.E.K.Hartmann, present
 Ruschia divaricata L.Bolus, indigenous
 Ruschia diversifolia L.Bolus, endemic
 Ruschia dolomitica (Dinter) Dinter & Schwantes, accepted as Antimima dolomitica (Dinter) H.E.K.Hartmann, present
 Ruschia drepanophylla (Schltr. & A.Berger) L.Bolus var. drepanophylla, accepted as Esterhuysenia drepanophylla (Schltr. & A.Berger) H.E.K.Hartmann, present
 Ruschia drepanophylla (Schltr. & A.Berger) L.Bolus var. sneeubergensis L.Bolus, accepted as Esterhuysenia drepanophylla (Schltr. & A.Berger) H.E.K.Hartmann, present
 Ruschia dualis (N.E.Br.) L.Bolus, accepted as Antimima dualis (N.E.Br.) N.E.Br. present
 Ruschia dubitans (L.Bolus) L.Bolus, accepted as Phiambolia unca (L.Bolus) Klak, present
 Ruschia duthiae (L.Bolus) Schwantes, endemic
 Ruschia ebracteata L.Bolus, accepted as Eberlanzia ebracteata (L.Bolus) H.E.K.Hartmann, present
 Ruschia edentula (Haw.) L.Bolus, endemic
 Ruschia elevata L.Bolus, accepted as Antimima elevata (L.Bolus) H.E.K.Hartmann, present
 Ruschia elineata L.Bolus, endemic
 Ruschia emarcidens L.Bolus ex H.Jacobsen, accepted as Antimima emarcescens (L.Bolus) H.E.K.Hartmann, present
 Ruschia erecta (L.Bolus) Schwantes, endemic
 Ruschia erosa L.Bolus, accepted as Antimima erosa (L.Bolus) H.E.K.Hartmann, present
 Ruschia esterhuyseniae L.Bolus, endemic
 Ruschia evoluta (N.E.Br.) L.Bolus, accepted as Antimima evoluta (N.E.Br.) H.E.K.Hartmann, present
 Ruschia excedens L.Bolus, accepted as Antimima excedens (L.Bolus) Klak, present
 Ruschia exigua L.Bolus, endemic
 Ruschia exsurgens L.Bolus, accepted as Antimima exsurgens (L.Bolus) H.E.K.Hartmann, present
 Ruschia extensa L.Bolus, endemic
 Ruschia fenestrata L.Bolus, accepted as Antimima fenestrata (L.Bolus) H.E.K.Hartmann, present
 Ruschia fergusoniae L.Bolus, accepted as Antimima fergusoniae (L.Bolus) H.E.K.Hartmann, present
 Ruschia festiva (N.E.Br.) Schwantes, endemic
 Ruschia filamentosa (L.) L.Bolus, accepted as Erepsia forficata (L.) Schwantes, present
 Ruschia filipetala L.Bolus, endemic
 Ruschia firma L.Bolus, endemic
 Ruschia floribunda L.Bolus, endemic
 Ruschia foliosa (Haw.) Schwantes, endemic
 Ruschia forficata (L.) L.Bolus, accepted as Erepsia forficata (L.) Schwantes, present
 Ruschia fourcadei L.Bolus, endemic
 Ruschia framesii L.Bolus, endemic
 Ruschia fredericii (L.Bolus) L.Bolus, endemic
 Ruschia frutescens (L.Bolus) L.Bolus, accepted as Stoeberia frutescens (L.Bolus) Van Jaarsv. present
 Ruschia fugitans L.Bolus, endemic
 Ruschia fulleri L.Bolus, accepted as Ebracteola fulleri (L.Bolus) Glen, present
 Ruschia gemina L.Bolus, accepted as Cerochlamys gemina (L.Bolus) H.E.K.Hartmann, present
 Ruschia geminiflora (Haw.) Schwantes, endemic
 Ruschia gibbosa L.Bolus, accepted as Leipoldtia compacta L.Bolus, present
 Ruschia glauca L.Bolus, endemic
 Ruschia globularis L.Bolus, accepted as Ruschia spinosa (L.) Dehn, present
 Ruschia goodiae L.Bolus, endemic
 Ruschia gracilipes L.Bolus, endemic
 Ruschia gracilis L.Bolus, endemic
 Ruschia gracillima L.Bolus, accepted as Antimima gracillima (L.Bolus) H.E.K.Hartmann, present
 Ruschia granitica (L.Bolus) L.Bolus, accepted as Antimima granitica (L.Bolus) H.E.K.Hartmann, indigenous
 Ruschia gravida L.Bolus, accepted as Eberlanzia gravida (L.Bolus) H.E.K.Hartmann, present
 Ruschia griquensis (L.Bolus) Schwantes, endemic
 Ruschia grisea (L.Bolus) Schwantes, endemic
 Ruschia hallii L.Bolus, accepted as Antimima hallii (L.Bolus) H.E.K.Hartmann, present
 Ruschia hamata (L.Bolus) Schwantes, indigenous
 Ruschia hamatilis L.Bolus, accepted as Antimima hamatilis (L.Bolus) H.E.K.Hartmann, present
 Ruschia haworthii H.Jacobsen & G.D.Rowley, endemic
 Ruschia herrei Schwantes, accepted as Antimima herrei (Schwantes) H.E.K.Hartmann, present
 Ruschia heteropetala L.Bolus, endemic
 Ruschia hexamera L.Bolus, accepted as Antimima paripetala (L.Bolus) Klak, endemic
 Ruschia hexamera L.Bolus var. longipetala L.Bolus, accepted as Antimima paripetala (L.Bolus) Klak, present
 Ruschia holensis L.Bolus, endemic
 Ruschia horrescens L.Bolus, accepted as Ruschia cradockensis (Kuntze) H.E.K.Hartmann & Stuber subsp. cradockensis, present
 Ruschia horrescens L.Bolus var. densa L.Bolus, accepted as Ruschia cradockensis (Kuntze) H.E.K.Hartmann & Stuber subsp. cradockensis, present
 Ruschia horrida L.Bolus, accepted as Ruschia cradockensis (Kuntze) H.E.K.Hartmann & Stuber subsp. cradockensis, present
 Ruschia hutchinsonii L.Bolus, accepted as Amphibolia laevis (Aiton) H.E.K.Hartmann, present
 Ruschia imbricata (Haw.) Schwantes, endemic
 Ruschia impressa L.Bolus, endemic
 Ruschia inclaudens L.Bolus, accepted as Esterhuysenia inclaudens (L.Bolus) H.E.K.Hartmann, present
 Ruschia inclusa L.Bolus, endemic
 Ruschia inconspicua L.Bolus, indigenous
 Ruschia incumbens L.Bolus, accepted as Phiambolia incumbens (L.Bolus) Klak, present
 Ruschia incurvata L.Bolus, endemic
 Ruschia indecora (L.Bolus) Schwantes, endemic
 Ruschia indurata (L.Bolus) Schwantes, endemic
 Ruschia insidens L.Bolus, accepted as Antimima insidens (L.Bolus) Chess. present
 Ruschia intermedia L.Bolus, endemic
 Ruschia intervallaris L.Bolus, accepted as Antimima intervallaris (L.Bolus) H.E.K.Hartmann, present
 Ruschia intricata (N.E.Br.) H.E.K.Hartmann & Stuber, endemic
 Ruschia intrusa (Kensit) L.Bolus, accepted as Brianhuntleya intrusa (Kensit) Chess. S.A.Hammer & I.Oliv. present
 Ruschia ivori (N.E.Br.) Schwantes, accepted as Antimima ivori (N.E.Br.) H.E.K.Hartmann, present
 Ruschia kakamasensis L.Bolus, accepted as Ruschia barnardii L.Bolus, present
 Ruschia karrachabensis L.Bolus, endemic
 Ruschia karroidea L.Bolus, accepted as Antimima karroidea (L.Bolus) H.E.K.Hartmann, present
 Ruschia karrooica (L.Bolus) L.Bolus, endemic
 Ruschia kenhardtensis L.Bolus, endemic
 Ruschia klaverensis (L.Bolus) Schwantes, accepted as Antimima klaverensis (L.Bolus) H.E.K.Hartmann, present
 Ruschia klipbergensis L.Bolus, endemic
 Ruschia knysnana (L.Bolus) L.Bolus, endemic
 Ruschia knysnana (L.Bolus) L.Bolus var. angustifolia L.Bolus, accepted as Ruschia knysnana (L.Bolus) L.Bolus, present
 Ruschia koekenaapensis L.Bolus, accepted as Antimima koekenaapensis (L.Bolus) H.E.K.Hartmann, present
 Ruschia komkansica L.Bolus, accepted as Antimima komkansica (L.Bolus) H.E.K.Hartmann, present
 Ruschia kuboosana L.Bolus, endemic
 Ruschia langebaanensis L.Bolus, endemic
 Ruschia lapidicola L.Bolus, endemic
 Ruschia lavisii L.Bolus, endemic
 Ruschia lawsonii (L.Bolus) L.Bolus, accepted as Antimima lawsonii (L.Bolus) H.E.K.Hartmann, present
 Ruschia laxa (Willd.) Schwantes, endemic
 Ruschia laxiflora L.Bolus, endemic
 Ruschia laxipetala L.Bolus, endemic
 Ruschia leipoldtii L.Bolus, accepted as Antimima leipoldtii (L.Bolus) H.E.K.Hartmann, present
 Ruschia leptocalyx L.Bolus, endemic
 Ruschia lerouxiae (L.Bolus) L.Bolus, endemic
 Ruschia leucanthera (L.Bolus) L.Bolus, accepted as Antimima leucanthera (L.Bolus) H.E.K.Hartmann, present
 Ruschia leucosperma L.Bolus, endemic
 Ruschia levynsiae (L.Bolus) Schwantes, accepted as Antimima pumila (Fedde & C.Schust.) H.E.K.Hartmann, present
 Ruschia limbata (N.E.Br.) Schwantes, accepted as Antimima granitica (L.Bolus) H.E.K.Hartmann, indigenous
 Ruschia lineolata (Haw.) Schwantes, endemic
 Ruschia lisabeliae L.Bolus, endemic
 Ruschia littlewoodii L.Bolus, accepted as Phiambolia littlewoodii (L.Bolus) Klak, endemic
 Ruschia lodewykii L.Bolus, accepted as Antimima lodewykii (L.Bolus) H.E.K.Hartmann, present
 Ruschia loganii L.Bolus, accepted as Antimima loganii (L.Bolus) H.E.K.Hartmann, present
 Ruschia lokenbergensis L.Bolus, accepted as Antimima lokenbergensis (L.Bolus) H.E.K.Hartmann, present
 Ruschia longipes L.Bolus, accepted as Antimima longipes (L.Bolus) Dehn, present
 Ruschia luckhoffii L.Bolus, accepted as Antimima luckhoffii (L.Bolus) H.E.K.Hartmann, present
 Ruschia macowanii (L.Bolus) Schwantes, endemic
 Ruschia magnifica Klak, endemic
 Ruschia maleolens L.Bolus, accepted as Antimima maleolens (L.Bolus) H.E.K.Hartmann, present
 Ruschia mariae L.Bolus, endemic
 Ruschia marianae (L.Bolus) Schwantes, endemic
 Ruschia mathewsii L.Bolus, accepted as Antimima mucronata (Haw.) H.E.K.Hartmann, present
 Ruschia maxima (Haw.) L.Bolus, endemic
 Ruschia maxwellii L.Bolus, accepted as Antimima maxwellii (L.Bolus) H.E.K.Hartmann, present
 Ruschia menniei L.Bolus, accepted as Antimima aristulata (Sond.) Chess. & Gideon F.Sm. indigenous
 Ruschia mesklipensis L.Bolus, accepted as Antimima mesklipensis (L.Bolus) H.E.K.Hartmann, present
 Ruschia meyerae Schwantes, accepted as Antimima meyerae (Schwantes) H.E.K.Hartmann, present
 Ruschia meyeri Schwantes, accepted as Antimima papillata (L.Bolus) H.E.K.Hartmann, present
 Ruschia microphylla (Haw.) Schwantes, accepted as Antimima microphylla (Haw.) Dehn, present
 Ruschia middlemostii L.Bolus, endemic
 Ruschia milleflora L.Bolus, accepted as Eberlanzia dichotoma (L.Bolus) H.E.K.Hartmann, present
 Ruschia misera (L.Bolus) L.Bolus, endemic
 Ruschia modesta L.Bolus forma modesta, accepted as Antimima modesta (L.Bolus) H.E.K.Hartmann
 Ruschia modesta L.Bolus forma glabrescens L.Bolus, accepted as Antimima modesta (L.Bolus) H.E.K.Hartmann
 Ruschia mollis (A.Berger) Schwantes, endemic
 Ruschia montaguensis L.Bolus, endemic
 Ruschia mucronata (Haw.) Schwantes, accepted as Antimima mucronata (Haw.) H.E.K.Hartmann, present
 Ruschia muelleri (L.Bolus) Schwantes, indigenous
 Ruschia muiriana (L.Bolus) Schwantes, endemic
 Ruschia multiflora (Haw.) Schwantes, endemic
 Ruschia muricata L.Bolus, indigenous
 Ruschia mutata G.D.Rowley, endemic
 Ruschia mutica L.Bolus, accepted as Antimima mutica (L.Bolus) H.E.K.Hartmann, present
 Ruschia namaquana L.Bolus, accepted as Amphibolia rupis-arcuatae (Dinter) H.E.K.Hartmann, present
 Ruschia nana L.Bolus, accepted as Octopoma nanum (L.Bolus) Klak, endemic
 Ruschia nelii Schwantes, endemic
 Ruschia neovirens Schwantes, endemic
 Ruschia nieuwerustensis L.Bolus, endemic
 Ruschia nobilis Schwantes, accepted as Antimima nobilis (Schwantes) H.E.K.Hartmann, present
 Ruschia nonimpressa L.Bolus, endemic
 Ruschia nordenstamii L.Bolus, accepted as Antimima nordenstamii (L.Bolus) H.E.K.Hartmann, present
 Ruschia obtusa L.Bolus, endemic
 Ruschia obtusifolia L.Bolus, accepted as Antimima watermeyeri (L.Bolus) H.E.K.Hartmann, present
 Ruschia orientalis L.Bolus, endemic
 Ruschia orsmondiae L.Bolus, accepted as Ruschia canonotata (L.Bolus) Schwantes, present
 Ruschia oviformis L.Bolus, accepted as Antimima oviformis (L.Bolus) H.E.K.Hartmann, present
 Ruschia pakhuisensis L.Bolus, accepted as Ruschiella lunulata (A.Berger) Klak, present
 Ruschia pallens L.Bolus, endemic
 Ruschia papillata L.Bolus, accepted as Antimima papillata (L.Bolus) H.E.K.Hartmann, present
 Ruschia paripetala (L.Bolus) L.Bolus, accepted as Antimima paripetala (L.Bolus) Klak, endemic
 Ruschia paripetala (L.Bolus) L.Bolus var. occultans L.Bolus, accepted as Antimima perforata (L.Bolus) H.E.K.Hartmann, present
 Ruschia parvibracteata L.Bolus, accepted as Eberlanzia parvibracteata (L.Bolus) H.E.K.Hartmann, present
 Ruschia parviflora (Haw.) Schwantes, endemic
 Ruschia parvifolia L.Bolus, endemic
 Ruschia patens L.Bolus, endemic
 Ruschia patulifolia L.Bolus, endemic
 Ruschia pauciflora L.Bolus, endemic
 Ruschia paucifolia L.Bolus, accepted as Antimima paucifolia (L.Bolus) H.E.K.Hartmann, present
 Ruschia paucipetala L.Bolus, endemic
 Ruschia pauper L.Bolus, accepted as Antimima pauper (L.Bolus) H.E.K.Hartmann, present
 Ruschia peersii L.Bolus, accepted as Antimima peersii (L.Bolus) H.E.K.Hartmann, present
 Ruschia perfoliata (Mill.) Schwantes, endemic
 Ruschia persistens L.Bolus, accepted as Ruschia intricata (N.E.Br.) H.E.K.Hartmann & Stuber, present
 Ruschia phylicoides L.Bolus, endemic
 Ruschia pillansii L.Bolus, accepted as Eberlanzia schneideriana (A.Berger) H.E.K.Hartmann, present
 Ruschia pilosula L.Bolus, accepted as Antimima pilosula (L.Bolus) H.E.K.Hartmann, present
 Ruschia pinguis L.Bolus, endemic
 Ruschia piscodora L.Bolus, accepted as Antimima piscodora (L.Bolus) H.E.K.Hartmann, present
 Ruschia polita L.Bolus, accepted as Braunsia geminata (Haw.) L.Bolus, present
 Ruschia primosii L.Bolus, endemic
 Ruschia profunda L.Bolus, accepted as Lampranthus profundus (L.Bolus) H.E.K.Hartmann, present
 Ruschia prolongata L.Bolus, accepted as Antimima prolongata (L.Bolus) H.E.K.Hartmann, present
 Ruschia promontorii L.Bolus, endemic
 Ruschia propinqua (N.E.Br.) Schwantes, accepted as Antimima propinqua (N.E.Br.) H.E.K.Hartmann, present
 Ruschia prostrata L.Bolus, accepted as Antimima prostrata (L.Bolus) H.E.K.Hartmann, present
 Ruschia pulchella (Haw.) Schwantes, indigenous
 Ruschia pulchella (Haw.) Schwantes var. caespitosa L.Bolus, accepted as Ruschia pulchella (Haw.) Schwantes, present
 Ruschia pulvinaris L.Bolus, endemic
 Ruschia pumila L.Bolus, accepted as Antimima pumila (Fedde & C.Schust.) H.E.K.Hartmann, present
 Ruschia punctulata (L.Bolus) L.Bolus ex H.E.K.Hartmann, endemic
 Ruschia pungens (A.Berger) H.Jacobsen, endemic
 Ruschia purpureostyla (L.Bolus) Bruyns, accepted as Acrodon purpureostylus (L.Bolus) Burgoyne, present
 Ruschia pusilla Schwantes, accepted as Antimima pusilla (Schwantes) H.E.K.Hartmann, present
 Ruschia putterillii (L.Bolus) L.Bolus, indigenous
 Ruschia pygmaea (Haw.) Schwantes, accepted as Antimima pygmaea (Haw.) H.E.K.Hartmann, present
 Ruschia quadrisepala L.Bolus, accepted as Octopoma quadrisepalum (L.Bolus) H.E.K.Hartmann, present
 Ruschia quarzitica (Dinter) Dinter & Schwantes, accepted as Antimima quarzitica (Dinter) H.E.K.Hartmann
 Ruschia radicans L.Bolus, accepted as Antimima radicans (L.Bolus) Klak, endemic
 Ruschia rariflora L.Bolus, endemic
 Ruschia recurva (Moench) H.E.K.Hartmann, endemic
 Ruschia rigens L.Bolus, endemic
 Ruschia rigida (Haw.) Schwantes, endemic
 Ruschia rigidicaulis (Haw.) Schwantes, endemic
 Ruschia robusta L.Bolus, indigenous
 Ruschia roseola (N.E.Br.) Schwantes, accepted as Antimima roseola (N.E.Br.) H.E.K.Hartmann, present
 Ruschia rostella (Haw.) Schwantes, endemic
 Ruschia rubricaulis (Haw.) L.Bolus, indigenous
 Ruschia rupigena L.Bolus, accepted as Octopoma rupigenum (L.Bolus) L.Bolus, present
 Ruschia rupis-arcuatae (Dinter) Friedrich, accepted as Amphibolia rupis-arcuatae (Dinter) H.E.K.Hartmann
 Ruschia ruralis (N.E.Br.) Schwantes, endemic
 Ruschia salteri L.Bolus, accepted as Hammeria meleagris (L.Bolus) Klak, present
 Ruschia sandbergensis L.Bolus, endemic
 Ruschia sarmentosa (Haw.) Schwantes, endemic
 Ruschia sarmentosa (Haw.) Schwantes var. rigida (Salm-Dyck) Schwantes, accepted as Ruschia sarmentosa (Haw.) Schwantes, present
 Ruschia saturata L.Bolus, accepted as Antimima saturata (L.Bolus) H.E.K.Hartmann, present
 Ruschia saxicola L.Bolus, accepted as Antimima saxicola (L.Bolus) H.E.K.Hartmann, present
 Ruschia scabra H.E.K.Hartmann, endemic
 Ruschia schlechteri Schwantes, accepted as Antimima schlechteri (Schwantes) H.E.K.Hartmann, present
 Ruschia schneideriana (A.Berger) L.Bolus, accepted as Eberlanzia schneideriana (A.Berger) H.E.K.Hartmann
 Ruschia schollii (Salm-Dyck) Schwantes, endemic
 Ruschia schollii (Salm-Dyck) Schwantes var. caledonica (L.Bolus) Schwantes, accepted as Ruschia schollii (Salm-Dyck) Schwantes, present
 Ruschia sedoides (Dinter & A.Berger) Friedrich, accepted as Eberlanzia sedoides (Dinter & A.Berger) Schwantes
 Ruschia semidentata (Haw.) Schwantes, endemic
 Ruschia semiglobosa L.Bolus, endemic
 Ruschia senaria L.Bolus, endemic
 Ruschia serrulata (Haw.) Schwantes, endemic
 Ruschia sessilis (Thunb.) H.E.K.Hartmann, endemic
 Ruschia simulans L.Bolus, accepted as Antimima simulans (L.Bolus) H.E.K.Hartmann, present
 Ruschia singula L.Bolus, endemic
 Ruschia sobrina (N.E.Br.) Schwantes, accepted as Antimima sobrina (N.E.Br.) H.E.K.Hartmann, present
 Ruschia socia (N.E.Br.) Schwantes, accepted as Argyroderma fissum (Haw.) L.Bolus, present
 Ruschia solida (L.Bolus) L.Bolus var. solida, accepted as Antimima solida (L.Bolus) H.E.K.Hartmann, present
 Ruschia solida (L.Bolus) L.Bolus var. stigmatosa L.Bolus, accepted as Antimima solida (L.Bolus) H.E.K.Hartmann, present
 Ruschia solitaria L.Bolus, endemic
 Ruschia spinescens L.Bolus, accepted as Arenifera spinescens (L.Bolus) H.E.K.Hartmann, present
 Ruschia spinosa (L.) Dehn, indigenous
 Ruschia staminodiosa L.Bolus, endemic
 Ruschia stayneri L.Bolus, accepted as Antimima stayneri (L.Bolus) H.E.K.Hartmann, present
 Ruschia stellata L.Bolus, accepted as Antimima hantamensis (Engl.) H.E.K.Hartmann & Stuber, present
 Ruschia stenopetala L.Bolus, accepted as Antimima watermeyeri (L.Bolus) H.E.K.Hartmann, present
 Ruschia stenophylla (L.Bolus) L.Bolus, accepted as Marlothistella stenophylla (L.Bolus) S.A.Hammer, present
 Ruschia stokoei L.Bolus, accepted as Antimima stokoei (L.Bolus) H.E.K.Hartmann, present
 Ruschia stricta L.Bolus, endemic
 Ruschia stricta L.Bolus var. turgida L.Bolus, accepted as Amphibolia saginata (L.Bolus) H.E.K.Hartmann, present
 Ruschia strubeniae (L.Bolus) Schwantes, endemic
 Ruschia stylosa L.Bolus, accepted as Arenifera stylosa (L.Bolus) H.E.K.Hartmann, present
 Ruschia suaveolens L.Bolus, endemic
 Ruschia subaphylla Friedrich, accepted as Ruschia abbreviata L.Bolus
 Ruschia subpaniculata L.Bolus, endemic
 Ruschia subsphaerica L.Bolus, endemic
 Ruschia subteres L.Bolus, endemic
 Ruschia subtruncata L.Bolus var. minor L.Bolus, accepted as Antimima subtruncata (L.Bolus) H.E.K.Hartmann, present
 Ruschia subtruncata L.Bolus var. subtruncata, accepted as Antimima subtruncata (L.Bolus) H.E.K.Hartmann, present
 Ruschia succulenta L.Bolus, accepted as Amphibolia succulenta (L.Bolus) H.E.K.Hartmann, present
 Ruschia tardissima L.Bolus, endemic
 Ruschia tecta L.Bolus, endemic
 Ruschia tenella (Haw.) Schwantes, endemic
 Ruschia testacea L.Bolus, endemic
 Ruschia tetrasepala L.Bolus, accepted as Octopoma tetrasepalum (L.Bolus) H.E.K.Hartmann, present
 Ruschia thomae L.Bolus var. thomae, accepted as Esterhuysenia stokoei (L.Bolus) H.E.K.Hartmann, present
 Ruschia thomae L.Bolus var. microstigma L.Bolus, accepted as Esterhuysenia stokoei (L.Bolus) H.E.K.Hartmann, present
 Ruschia translucens L.Bolus, accepted as Stoeberia beetzii (Dinter) Dinter & Schwantes, present
 Ruschia tribracteata L.Bolus, endemic
 Ruschia triflora L.Bolus, endemic
 Ruschia triquetra L.Bolus, accepted as Antimima triquetra (L.Bolus) H.E.K.Hartmann, present
 Ruschia truteri L.Bolus, endemic
 Ruschia tuberculosa L.Bolus, accepted as Antimima tuberculosa (L.Bolus) H.E.K.Hartmann, present
 Ruschia tumidula (Haw.) Schwantes, indigenous
 Ruschia turneriana L.Bolus, accepted as Antimima turneriana (L.Bolus) H.E.K.Hartmann, present
 Ruschia uitenhagensis (L.Bolus) Schwantes, endemic
 Ruschia umbellata (L.) Schwantes, endemic
 Ruschia unca (L.Bolus) L.Bolus, accepted as Phiambolia unca (L.Bolus) Klak, present
 Ruschia uncinata (L.) Schwantes, indigenous
 Ruschia unidens (Haw.) Schwantes, indigenous
 Ruschia utilis (L.Bolus) L.Bolus, accepted as Stoeberia utilis (L.Bolus) Van Jaarsv.
 Ruschia utilis (L.Bolus) L.Bolus var. giftbergensis L.Bolus, accepted as Stoeberia giftbergensis (L.Bolus) Van Jaarsv. indigenous
 Ruschia vaginata (Haw.) Schwantes, endemic
 Ruschia valida Schwantes, endemic
 Ruschia vanbredai L.Bolus, endemic
 Ruschia vanderbergiae L.Bolus, endemic
 Ruschia vanheerdei L.Bolus, endemic
 Ruschia vanniekerkiae L.Bolus, endemic
 Ruschia vanzylii L.Bolus, accepted as Antimima vanzylii (L.Bolus) H.E.K.Hartmann, present
 Ruschia varians L.Bolus, accepted as Antimima varians (L.Bolus) H.E.K.Hartmann, present
 Ruschia ventricosa (L.Bolus) Schwantes, accepted as Antimima ventricosa (L.Bolus) H.E.K.Hartmann, present
 Ruschia verruculosa L.Bolus, accepted as Antimima verruculosa (L.Bolus) H.E.K.Hartmann, present
 Ruschia versicolor L.Bolus, endemic
 Ruschia vetovalida H.E.K.Hartmann, endemic
 Ruschia victoris (L.Bolus) L.Bolus, endemic
 Ruschia villetii L.Bolus, accepted as Antimima dualis (N.E.Br.) N.E.Br. present
 Ruschia virens L.Bolus, endemic
 Ruschia virgata (Haw.) L.Bolus, endemic
 Ruschia viridifolia L.Bolus, endemic
 Ruschia vulnerans L.Bolus, accepted as Ruschia divaricata L.Bolus, present
 Ruschia watermeyeri L.Bolus, accepted as Antimima watermeyeri (L.Bolus) H.E.K.Hartmann, present
 Ruschia willdenowii Schwantes, endemic
 Ruschia wittebergensis (L.Bolus) Schwantes, accepted as Antimima wittebergensis (L.Bolus) H.E.K.Hartmann, present

Ruschianthemum 
Genus Ruschianthemum:
 Ruschianthemum gigas (Dinter) Friedrich, accepted as Stoeberia gigas (Dinter) Dinter & Schwantes

Ruschiella 
Genus Ruschiella:
 Ruschiella argentea (L.Bolus) Klak, endemic
 Ruschiella cedrimontana Klak, endemic
 Ruschiella henricii (L.Bolus) Klak, endemic
 Ruschiella lunulata (A.Berger) Klak, endemic

Saphesia 
Genus Saphesia:
 Saphesia flaccida (Jacq.) N.E.Br. endemic

Sceletium 
Genus Sceletium: (synonym of Mesembryanthemum)
 Sceletium albanense L.Bolus, accepted as Mesembryanthemum crassicaule Haw. indigenous
 Sceletium anatomicum (Haw.) L.Bolus, accepted as Mesembryanthemum emarcidum Thunb. present
 Sceletium archeri L.Bolus, accepted as Mesembryanthemum archeri (L.Bolus) Klak, indigenous
 Sceletium boreale L.Bolus, accepted as Mesembryanthemum tortuosum L. present
 Sceletium compactum L.Bolus, accepted as Mesembryanthemum tortuosum L. present
 Sceletium crassicaule (Haw.) L.Bolus, accepted as Mesembryanthemum crassicaule Haw. endemic
 Sceletium dejagerae L.Bolus, accepted as Mesembryanthemum emarcidum Thunb. present
 Sceletium emarcidum (Thunb.) L.Bolus ex H.Jacobsen, accepted as Mesembryanthemum emarcidum Thunb. endemic
 Sceletium exalatum Gerbaulet, accepted as Mesembryanthemum exalatum (Gerbaulet) Klak, endemic
 Sceletium expansum (L.) L.Bolus, accepted as Mesembryanthemum expansum L. endemic
 Sceletium framesii L.Bolus, accepted as Mesembryanthemum tortuosum L. present
 Sceletium gracile L.Bolus, accepted as Mesembryanthemum tortuosum L. present
 Sceletium joubertii L.Bolus, accepted as Mesembryanthemum tortuosum L. present
 Sceletium namaquense L.Bolus, accepted as Mesembryanthemum tortuosum L. indigenous
 Sceletium namaquense L.Bolus var. subglobosum L.Bolus, accepted as Mesembryanthemum tortuosum L. present
 Sceletium ovatum L.Bolus, accepted as Mesembryanthemum tortuosum L. present
 Sceletium regium L.Bolus, accepted as Mesembryanthemum expansum L. present
 Sceletium rigidum L.Bolus, accepted as Mesembryanthemum archeri (L.Bolus) Klak, endemic
 Sceletium strictum L.Bolus, accepted as Mesembryanthemum ladismithiense Klak, endemic
 Sceletium subvelutinum L.Bolus forma luxurians L.Bolus, accepted as Mesembryanthemum varians Haw. present
 Sceletium tortuosum (L.) N.E.Br. accepted as Mesembryanthemum tortuosum L. endemic
 Sceletium tugwelliae L.Bolus, accepted as Mesembryanthemum tortuosum L. present
 Sceletium varians (Haw.) Gerbaulet, accepted as Mesembryanthemum varians Haw. endemic

Schlechteranthus 
Genus Schlechteranthus:
 Schlechteranthus hallii L.Bolus, endemic
 Schlechteranthus maximilianii Schwantes, endemic

Schwantesia 
Genus Schwantesia:
 Schwantesia acutipetala L.Bolus, indigenous
 Schwantesia australis L.Bolus, accepted as Schwantesia ruedebuschii Dinter, present
 Schwantesia borcherdsii L.Bolus, endemic
 Schwantesia herrei L.Bolus, indigenous
 Schwantesia herrei L.Bolus var. herrei forma major, accepted as Schwantesia herrei L.Bolus
 Schwantesia herrei L.Bolus var. minor L.Bolus, accepted as Schwantesia herrei L.Bolus
 Schwantesia marlothii L.Bolus, endemic
 Schwantesia pillansii L.Bolus, endemic
 Schwantesia ruedebuschii Dinter, indigenous
 Schwantesia speciosa L.Bolus, endemic
 Schwantesia triebneri L.Bolus, endemic

Scopelogena 
Genus Scopelogena :
 Scopelogena bruynsii Klak, endemic
 Scopelogena gracilis L.Bolus, accepted as Scopelogena verruculata (L.) L.Bolus, present
 Scopelogena verruculata (L.) L.Bolus, endemic

Semnanthe 
Genus Semnanthe:

 Semnanthe lacera (Haw.) N.E.Br. var. lacera, accepted as Erepsia lacera (Haw.) Liede, present
 Semnanthe lacera (Haw.) N.E.Br. var. densipetala L.Bolus, accepted as Erepsia lacera (Haw.) Liede, present

Sesuvium 
Genus Sesuvium:
 Sesuvium sesuvioides (Fenzl) Verdc. indigenous
 Sesuvium sesuvioides (Fenzl) Verdc. var. angustifolium (Schinz) M.L.Gonçalves. accepted as Sesuvium sesuvioides (Fenzl) Verdc.

Sineoperculum 
Genus Sineoperculum:
 Sineoperculum rourkei (L.Bolus) Van Jaarsv. accepted as Cleretum rourkei (L.Bolus) Klak, present

Skiatophytum 
Genus Skiatophytum:
 Skiatophytum tripolium (L.) L.Bolus, endemic

Smicrostigma 
Genus Smicrostigma:
 Smicrostigma viride (Haw.) N.E.Br. endemic

Sphalmanthus 
Genus Sphalmanthus:
 Sphalmanthus abbreviatus (L.Bolus) L.Bolus, accepted as Mesembryanthemum lilliputanum Klak, indigenous
 Sphalmanthus acocksii L.Bolus, accepted as Mesembryanthemum baylissii (L.Bolus) Klak, present
 Sphalmanthus acuminatus (Haw.) L.Bolus, accepted as Mesembryanthemum splendens L. subsp. splendens, present
 Sphalmanthus albertensis (L.Bolus) L.Bolus, accepted as Mesembryanthemum oubergense (L.Bolus) Klak, indigenous
 Sphalmanthus albicaulis (Haw.) L.Bolus, accepted as Mesembryanthemum splendens L. subsp. splendens, present
 Sphalmanthus anguineus (L.Bolus) L.Bolus, accepted as Mesembryanthemum oculatum N.E.Br. indigenous
 Sphalmanthus arenicolus (L.Bolus) L.Bolus, accepted as Mesembryanthemum oculatum N.E.Br. indigenous
 Sphalmanthus auratus (Sond.) L.Bolus, accepted as Mesembryanthemum nitidum Haw. indigenous
 Sphalmanthus baylissii L.Bolus, accepted as Mesembryanthemum baylissii (L.Bolus) Klak, indigenous
 Sphalmanthus bijliae (N.E.Br.) L.Bolus, accepted as Mesembryanthemum splendens L. subsp. splendens, present
 Sphalmanthus blandus (L.Bolus) L.Bolus, accepted as Mesembryanthemum splendens L. subsp. splendens, present
 Sphalmanthus brevisepalus (L.Bolus) L.Bolus, accepted as Mesembryanthemum spinuliferum Haw. indigenous
 Sphalmanthus brevisepalus (L.Bolus) L.Bolus var. ferus (L.Bolus) L.Bolus, accepted as Mesembryanthemum spinuliferum Haw. indigenous
 Sphalmanthus calycinus L.Bolus, accepted as Mesembryanthemum canaliculatum Haw. indigenous
 Sphalmanthus canaliculatus (Haw.) N.E.Br. accepted as Mesembryanthemum canaliculatum Haw. indigenous
 Sphalmanthus carneus (Haw.) N.E.Br. accepted as Mesembryanthemum spinuliferum Haw. indigenous
 Sphalmanthus caudatus (L.Bolus) N.E.Br. accepted as Mesembryanthemum caudatum L.Bolus, indigenous
 Sphalmanthus celans (L.Bolus) L.Bolus, accepted as Mesembryanthemum splendens L. subsp. splendens, present
 Sphalmanthus commutatus (A.Berger) N.E.Br. accepted as Mesembryanthemum grossum Aiton, indigenous
 Sphalmanthus congestus (L.Bolus) L.Bolus, accepted as Mesembryanthemum flavidum Klak, indigenous
 Sphalmanthus constrictus (L.Bolus) L.Bolus, accepted as Mesembryanthemum splendens L. subsp. splendens, present
 Sphalmanthus crassus L.Bolus, accepted as Mesembryanthemum prasinum (L.Bolus) Klak, indigenous
 Sphalmanthus deciduus (L.Bolus) L.Bolus, accepted as Mesembryanthemum deciduum (L.Bolus) Klak, indigenous
 Sphalmanthus decurvatus (L.Bolus) L.Bolus, accepted as Mesembryanthemum decurvatum (L.Bolus) Klak, indigenous
 Sphalmanthus decussatus (Thunb.) L.Bolus, accepted as Mesembryanthemum geniculiflorum L. present
 Sphalmanthus defoliatus (Haw.) L.Bolus, accepted as Mesembryanthemum noctiflorum L. subsp. defoliatum (Haw.) Klak, indigenous
 Sphalmanthus delus (L.Bolus) L.Bolus, accepted as Mesembryanthemum delum L.Bolus, indigenous
 Sphalmanthus dinteri (L.Bolus) L.Bolus, accepted as Mesembryanthemum ligneum (L.Bolus) Klak, indigenous
 Sphalmanthus dyeri (L.Bolus) L.Bolus, accepted as Mesembryanthemum splendens L. subsp. splendens, present
 Sphalmanthus englishiae (L.Bolus) L.Bolus, accepted as Mesembryanthemum englishiae L.Bolus, indigenous
 Sphalmanthus flexuosus (Haw.) L.Bolus, accepted as Mesembryanthemum splendens L. subsp. splendens,  present
 Sphalmanthus fourcadei (L.Bolus) L.Bolus, accepted as Mesembryanthemum splendens L. subsp. splendens,  present
 Sphalmanthus fragilis N.E.Br. accepted as Mesembryanthemum oculatum N.E.Br. indigenous
 Sphalmanthus framesii (L.Bolus) L.Bolus, accepted as Mesembryanthemum spinuliferum Haw. indigenous
 Sphalmanthus geniculiflorus (L.) L.Bolus, accepted as Mesembryanthemum geniculiflorum L. indigenous
 Sphalmanthus glanduliferus (L.Bolus) L.Bolus, accepted as Mesembryanthemum sinuosum L.Bolus, indigenous
 Sphalmanthus godmaniae (L.Bolus) L.Bolus, accepted as Mesembryanthemum sinuosum L.Bolus, indigenous
 Sphalmanthus gratiae (L.Bolus) L.Bolus, accepted as Mesembryanthemum grossum Aiton, indigenous
 Sphalmanthus grossus (Aiton) N.E.Br. accepted as Mesembryanthemum grossum Aiton, indigenous
 Sphalmanthus gydouwensis L.Bolus, accepted as Mesembryanthemum grossum Aiton, indigenous
 Sphalmanthus hallii L.Bolus, accepted as Mesembryanthemum delum L.Bolus, indigenous
 Sphalmanthus herbertii N.E.Br. accepted as Mesembryanthemum lilliputanum Klak, indigenous
 Sphalmanthus herrei L.Bolus, accepted as Mesembryanthemum prasinum (L.Bolus) Klak, indigenous
 Sphalmanthus humilis L.Bolus, accepted as Mesembryanthemum holense Klak, indigenous
 Sphalmanthus latipetalus (L.Bolus) L.Bolus, accepted as Mesembryanthemum latipetalum (L.Bolus) Klak, indigenous
 Sphalmanthus laxipetalus (L.Bolus) L.Bolus, accepted as Mesembryanthemum grossum Aiton, indigenous
 Sphalmanthus laxus (L.Bolus) N.E.Br. accepted as Mesembryanthemum decurvatum (L.Bolus) Klak, present
 Sphalmanthus leipoldtii L.Bolus, accepted as Mesembryanthemum grossum Aiton, indigenous
 Sphalmanthus leptopetalus (L.Bolus) L.Bolus, accepted as Mesembryanthemum splendens L. subsp. splendens, present
 Sphalmanthus lignescens L.Bolus, accepted as Mesembryanthemum lignescens (L.Bolus) Klak, indigenous
 Sphalmanthus ligneus (L.Bolus) L.Bolus, accepted as Mesembryanthemum ligneum (L.Bolus) Klak, indigenous
 Sphalmanthus littlewoodii L.Bolus, accepted as Mesembryanthemum nitidum Haw. indigenous
 Sphalmanthus longipapillatus L.Bolus, accepted as Mesembryanthemum oculatum N.E.Br. indigenous
 Sphalmanthus longispinulus (Haw.) N.E.Br. accepted as Mesembryanthemum grossum Aiton, indigenous
 Sphalmanthus longitubus (L.Bolus) L.Bolus, accepted as Mesembryanthemum tenuiflorum Jacq. indigenous
 Sphalmanthus macrosiphon (L.Bolus) L.Bolus, accepted as Mesembryanthemum tenuiflorum Jacq. indigenous
 Sphalmanthus melanospermus Dinter & Schwantes, accepted as Mesembryanthemum ligneum (L.Bolus) Klak, indigenous
 Sphalmanthus micans L.Bolus, accepted as Mesembryanthemum resurgens Kensit, indigenous
 Sphalmanthus nanus L.Bolus, accepted as Mesembryanthemum tenuiflorum Jacq. indigenous
 Sphalmanthus nitidus (Haw.) L.Bolus, accepted as Mesembryanthemum nitidum Haw. indigenous
 Sphalmanthus nothus (N.E.Br.) Schwantes, accepted as Mesembryanthemum splendens L. subsp. splendens, present
 Sphalmanthus obtusus (L.Bolus) L.Bolus, accepted as Mesembryanthemum decurvatum (L.Bolus) Klak, present
 Sphalmanthus oculatus (N.E.Br.) N.E.Br. accepted as Mesembryanthemum oculatum N.E.Br. indigenous
 Sphalmanthus olivaceus (Schltr. & A.Berger) L.Bolus, accepted as Mesembryanthemum tenuiflorum Jacq. indigenous
 Sphalmanthus oubergensis (L.Bolus) L.Bolus, accepted as Mesembryanthemum oubergense (L.Bolus) Klak, indigenous
 Sphalmanthus pentagonus (L.Bolus) L.Bolus, accepted as Mesembryanthemum splendens L. subsp. pentagonum (L.Bolus) Klak, indigenous
 Sphalmanthus pentagonus (L.Bolus) L.Bolus var. occidentalis (L.Bolus) L.Bolus, accepted as Mesembryanthemum splendens L. subsp. pentagonum (L.Bolus) Klak, present
 Sphalmanthus platysepalus (L.Bolus) L.Bolus, accepted as Mesembryanthemum grossum Aiton, indigenous
 Sphalmanthus plenifolius (N.E.Br.) L.Bolus, accepted as Mesembryanthemum splendens L. subsp. splendens, present
 Sphalmanthus pomonae (L.Bolus) L.Bolus, accepted as Mesembryanthemum oculatum N.E.Br. indigenous
 Sphalmanthus praecox L.Bolus, accepted as Mesembryanthemum sinuosum L.Bolus, indigenous
 Sphalmanthus prasinus (L.Bolus) L.Bolus, accepted as Mesembryanthemum prasinum (L.Bolus) Klak, indigenous
 Sphalmanthus primulinus (L.Bolus) L.Bolus, accepted as Mesembryanthemum splendens L. subsp. splendens, present
 Sphalmanthus pumulis (L.Bolus) L.Bolus, accepted as Mesembryanthemum oubergense (L.Bolus) Klak, indigenous
 Sphalmanthus quarternus (L.Bolus) L.Bolus, accepted as Mesembryanthemum spinuliferum Haw. indigenous
 Sphalmanthus quarziticus (L.Bolus) L.Bolus, accepted as Mesembryanthemum quartziticola Klak, indigenous
 Sphalmanthus rabiei (L.Bolus) N.E.Br. accepted as Mesembryanthemum rabiei (L.Bolus) Klak, endemic
 Sphalmanthus rabiesbergensis (L.Bolus) L.Bolus, accepted as Mesembryanthemum splendens L. subsp. splendens, present
 Sphalmanthus radicans (L.Bolus) L.Bolus, accepted as Mesembryanthemum rhizophorum Klak, indigenous
 Sphalmanthus recurvus (L.Bolus) L.Bolus, accepted as Mesembryanthemum sinuosum L.Bolus, indigenous
 Sphalmanthus reflexus (Haw.) L.Bolus, accepted as Mesembryanthemum splendens L. subsp. splendens, present
 Sphalmanthus rejuvenalis L.Bolus, accepted as Mesembryanthemum spinuliferum Haw. indigenous
 Sphalmanthus resurgens (Kensit) L.Bolus, accepted as Mesembryanthemum resurgens Kensit, indigenous
 Sphalmanthus rhodandrus (L.Bolus) L.Bolus, accepted as Mesembryanthemum nitidum Haw. indigenous
 Sphalmanthus roseus (L.Bolus) L.Bolus, accepted as Mesembryanthemum splendens L. subsp. splendens, present
 Sphalmanthus salmoneus (Haw.) N.E.Br. accepted as Mesembryanthemum canaliculatum Haw. indigenous
 Sphalmanthus saturatus (L.Bolus) L.Bolus, accepted as Mesembryanthemum baylissii (L.Bolus) Klak, present
 Sphalmanthus scintillans (Dinter) Dinter & Schwantes, accepted as Mesembryanthemum oculatum N.E.Br. indigenous
 Sphalmanthus sinuosus (L.Bolus) L.Bolus, accepted as Mesembryanthemum sinuosum L.Bolus, indigenous
 Sphalmanthus spinuliferus (Haw.) L.Bolus, accepted as Mesembryanthemum spinuliferum Haw. indigenous
 Sphalmanthus splendens (L.) L.Bolus, accepted as Mesembryanthemum splendens L. subsp. splendens, present
 Sphalmanthus stayneri L.Bolus, accepted as Mesembryanthemum delum L.Bolus, indigenous
 Sphalmanthus straminicolor (L.Bolus) L.Bolus, accepted as Mesembryanthemum sinuosum L.Bolus, indigenous
 Sphalmanthus striatus (L.Bolus) L.Bolus, accepted as Mesembryanthemum splendens L. subsp. splendens, present
 Sphalmanthus strictus (L.Bolus) L.Bolus, accepted as Mesembryanthemum spinuliferum Haw. indigenous
 Sphalmanthus suaveolens (L.Bolus) H.Jacobsen, accepted as Mesembryanthemum lignescens (L.Bolus) Klak
 Sphalmanthus subaequans (L.Bolus) L.Bolus, accepted as Mesembryanthemum splendens L. subsp. pentagonum (L.Bolus) Klak, present
 Sphalmanthus subpatens (L.Bolus) L.Bolus, accepted as Mesembryanthemum splendens L. subsp. pentagonum (L.Bolus) Klak, present
 Sphalmanthus subpetiolatus (L.Bolus) L.Bolus, accepted as Mesembryanthemum grossum Aiton, indigenous
 Sphalmanthus suffusus (L.Bolus) L.Bolus, accepted as Mesembryanthemum tetragonum Thunb. indigenous
 Sphalmanthus sulcatus (Haw.) L.Bolus, accepted as Mesembryanthemum splendens L. subsp. splendens, present
 Sphalmanthus tenuiflorus (Jacq.) N.E.Br. accepted as Mesembryanthemum tenuiflorum Jacq. indigenous
 Sphalmanthus tetragonus (Thunb.) L.Bolus, accepted as Mesembryanthemum tetragonum Thunb. indigenous
 Sphalmanthus tetramerus (L.Bolus) L.Bolus, accepted as Mesembryanthemum trichotomum Thunb. indigenous
 Sphalmanthus tetramerus (L.Bolus) L.Bolus var. parviflorus (L.Bolus) L.Bolus, accepted as Mesembryanthemum trichotomum Thunb. indigenous
 Sphalmanthus trichotomus (Thunb.) L.Bolus, accepted as Mesembryanthemum trichotomum Thunb. indigenous
 Sphalmanthus umbelliflorus (Jacq.) L.Bolus, accepted as Mesembryanthemum splendens L. subsp. splendens, present
 Sphalmanthus vanheerdei L.Bolus, accepted as Mesembryanthemum vanheerdei (L.Bolus) Klak, endemic
 Sphalmanthus varians (L.Bolus) L.Bolus, accepted as Mesembryanthemum oculatum N.E.Br. indigenous
 Sphalmanthus vernalis (L.Bolus) L.Bolus, accepted as Mesembryanthemum splendens L. subsp. splendens, present
 Sphalmanthus vigilans (L.Bolus) L.Bolus, accepted as Mesembryanthemum longistylum DC. indigenous
 Sphalmanthus viridiflorus (Aiton) N.E.Br. accepted as Mesembryanthemum viridiflorum Aiton, indigenous
 Sphalmanthus watermeyeri (L.Bolus) L.Bolus, accepted as Mesembryanthemum spinuliferum Haw. indigenous
 Sphalmanthus willowmorensis (L.Bolus) L.Bolus, accepted as Mesembryanthemum grossum Aiton, indigenous

Stayneria 
Genus Stayneria:
 Stayneria neilii (L.Bolus) L.Bolus, endemic

Stoeberia 
Genus Stoeberia:
 Stoeberia apetala L.Bolus, accepted as Stoeberia beetzii (Dinter) Dinter & Schwantes
 Stoeberia arborea Van Jaarsv. indigenous
 Stoeberia beetzii (Dinter) Dinter & Schwantes, indigenous
 Stoeberia beetzii (Dinter) Dinter & Schwantes var. arborescens Friedrich, accepted as Stoeberia beetzii (Dinter) Dinter & Schwantes
 Stoeberia carpii Friedrich, indigenous
 Stoeberia frutescens (L.Bolus) Van Jaarsv. indigenous
 Stoeberia giftbergensis (L.Bolus) Van Jaarsv. endemic
 Stoeberia gigas (Dinter) Dinter & Schwantes, indigenous
 Stoeberia porphyrea H.E.K.Hartmann, accepted as Stoeberia arborea Van Jaarsv. present
 Stoeberia utilis (L.Bolus) Van Jaarsv. indigenous
 Stoeberia utilis (L.Bolus) Van Jaarsv. subsp. lerouxiae Van Jaarsv. indigenous
 Stoeberia utilis (L.Bolus) Van Jaarsv. subsp. utilis, indigenous

Stomatium 
Genus Stomatium:
 Stomatium acutifolium L.Bolus, endemic
 Stomatium agninum (Haw.) Schwantes, endemic
 Stomatium agninum (Haw.) Schwantes var. integrifolium (Salm-Dyck) Volk, accepted as Stomatium agninum (Haw.) Schwantes, present
 Stomatium alboroseum L.Bolus, endemic
 Stomatium angustifolium L.Bolus, endemic
 Stomatium beaufortense L.Bolus, endemic
 Stomatium bolusiae Schwantes, endemic
 Stomatium braunsii L.Bolus, endemic
 Stomatium bryantii L.Bolus, endemic
 Stomatium deficiens L.Bolus, endemic
 Stomatium difforme L.Bolus, endemic
 Stomatium duthiae L.Bolus, endemic
 Stomatium ermininum (Haw.) Schwantes, endemic
 Stomatium fulleri L.Bolus, endemic
 Stomatium geoffreyi L.Bolus, endemic
 Stomatium gerstneri L.Bolus, endemic
 Stomatium grandidens L.Bolus, endemic
 Stomatium integrum L.Bolus, endemic
 Stomatium jamesii L.Bolus, endemic
 Stomatium latifolium L.Bolus, endemic
 Stomatium lesliei (Schwantes) Volk, endemic
 Stomatium leve L.Bolus, endemic
 Stomatium loganii L.Bolus, endemic
 Stomatium meyeri L.Bolus, endemic
 Stomatium middelburgense L.Bolus, endemic
 Stomatium murinum (Haw.) Schwantes, endemic
 Stomatium mustellinum (Salm-Dyck) Schwantes, endemic
 Stomatium niveum L.Bolus, accepted as Stomatium alboroseum L.Bolus, present
 Stomatium patulum H.Jacobsen, endemic
 Stomatium paucidens L.Bolus, endemic
 Stomatium peersii L.Bolus, endemic
 Stomatium pluridens L.Bolus, endemic
 Stomatium pyrodorum (Diels) L.Bolus, accepted as Stomatium mustellinum (Salm-Dyck) Schwantes, present
 Stomatium resedolens L.Bolus, endemic
 Stomatium ronaldii L.Bolus, endemic
 Stomatium rouxii L.Bolus, endemic
 Stomatium ryderae L.Bolus, endemic
 Stomatium suaveolens Schwantes, endemic
 Stomatium suricatinum L.Bolus, endemic
 Stomatium trifarium L.Bolus, endemic
 Stomatium villetii L.Bolus, endemic
 Stomatium viride L.Bolus, endemic

Synaptophyllum 
Genus Synaptophyllum:
 Synaptophyllum sladenianum (L.Bolus) N.E.Br. accepted as Mesembryanthemum sladenianum L.Bolus, indigenous

Tanquana 
Genus Tanquana:
 Tanquana archeri (L.Bolus) H.E.K.Hartmann & Liede, endemic
 Tanquana hilmarii (L.Bolus) H.E.K.Hartmann & Liede, endemic
 Tanquana prismatica (Schwantes) H.E.K.Hartmann & Liede, endemic

Tetracoilanthus 
Genus Tetracoilanthus:
 Tetracoilanthus anatomicus (Haw.) Rappa & Camarrone, accepted as Mesembryanthemum emarcidum Thunb. present
 Tetracoilanthus cordifolius (L.f.) Rappa & Camarrone, accepted as Mesembryanthemum cordifolium L.f. indigenous

Tetragonia 
Genus Tetragonia:
 Tetragonia acanthocarpa Adamson, endemic
 Tetragonia arbuscula Fenzl, indigenous
 Tetragonia caesia Adamson, endemic
 Tetragonia calycina Fenzl, indigenous
 Tetragonia chenopodioides Eckl. & Zeyh. endemic
 Tetragonia decumbens Mill. indigenous
 Tetragonia dimorphantha Pax, accepted as Tribulocarpus dimorphanthus (Pax) S.Moore, present
 Tetragonia distorta Fenzl, endemic
 Tetragonia echinata Aiton, endemic
 Tetragonia erecta Adamson, endemic
 Tetragonia fruticosa L. endemic
 Tetragonia galenioides Fenzl, endemic
 Tetragonia glauca Fenzl, endemic
 Tetragonia halimoides Fenzl, endemic
 Tetragonia haworthii Fenzl, endemic
 Tetragonia herbacea L. endemic
 Tetragonia hirsuta L.f. endemic
 Tetragonia lasiantha Adamson, endemic
 Tetragonia macroptera Pax, accepted as Tetragonia calycina Fenzl, present
 Tetragonia microptera Fenzl, indigenous
 Tetragonia namaquensis Schltr. endemic
 Tetragonia nigrescens Eckl. & Zeyh. endemic
 Tetragonia pillansii Adamson, endemic
 Tetragonia portulacoides Fenzl, endemic
 Tetragonia reduplicata Welw. ex Oliv. indigenous
 Tetragonia robusta Fenzl, endemic
 Tetragonia robusta Fenzl var. psiloptera (Fenzl) Adamson, accepted as Tetragonia robusta Fenzl, present
 Tetragonia robusta Fenzl var. robusta, accepted as Tetragonia robusta Fenzl, present
 Tetragonia rosea Schltr. endemic
 Tetragonia saligna Fenzl, endemic
 Tetragonia saligna Fenzl var. extrusa Adamson, accepted as Tetragonia saligna Fenzl, present
 Tetragonia saligna Fenzl var. latifolia Adamson, accepted as Tetragonia saligna Fenzl, present
 Tetragonia sarcophylla Fenzl, endemic
 Tetragonia sarcophylla Fenzl var. sarcophylla, accepted as Tetragonia sarcophylla Fenzl, present
 Tetragonia sarcophylla Fenzl var. saxatilis (E.Phillips) Adamson, accepted as Tetragonia sarcophylla Fenzl, present
 Tetragonia sphaerocarpa Adamson, endemic
 Tetragonia spicata L.f. indigenous
 Tetragonia spicata L.f. var. laxa Adamson, accepted as Tetragonia spicata L.f. present
 Tetragonia spicata L.f. var. spicata,  accepted as Tetragonia spicata L.f. present
 Tetragonia tetragonioides (Pall.) Kuntze, indigenous
 Tetragonia verrucosa Fenzl, indigenous
 Tetragonia virgata Schltr. endemic

Titanopsis 
Genus Titanopsis:
 Titanopsis calcarea (Marloth) Schwantes, endemic
 Titanopsis fulleri Tischer, accepted as Titanopsis calcarea (Marloth) Schwantes, present
 Titanopsis hugo-schlechteri (Tischer) Dinter & Schwantes, indigenous
 Titanopsis hugo-schlechteri (Tischer) Dinter & Schwantes var. alboviridis  Dinter, accepted as Titanopsis hugo-schlechteri (Tischer) Dinter & Schwantes
 Titanopsis luckhoffii L.Bolus, accepted as Aloinopsis luckhoffii (L.Bolus) L.Bolus, present
 Titanopsis luederitzii Tischer, accepted as Titanopsis schwantesii (Dinter) Schwantes
 Titanopsis primosii L.Bolus, accepted as Titanopsis schwantesii (Dinter) Schwantes, present
 Titanopsis spathulata (Thunb.) Schwantes, accepted as Aloinopsis spathulata (Thunb.) L.Bolus

Trianthema 
Genus Trianthema:
 Trianthema parvifolia E.Mey. ex Sond. indigenous
 Trianthema parvifolia E.Mey. ex Sond. var. parvifolia,  indigenous
 Trianthema parvifolia E.Mey. ex Sond. var. rubens  (Sond.) Adamson, indigenous
 Trianthema portulacastrum L. indigenous
 Trianthema salsoloides Fenzl ex Oliv. indigenous
 Trianthema salsoloides Fenzl ex Oliv. var. salsoloides,  indigenous
 Trianthema salsoloides Fenzl ex Oliv. var. stenophylla  Adamson, indigenous
 Trianthema salsoloides Fenzl ex Oliv. var. transvaalensis  (Schinz) Adamson, indigenous
 Trianthema triquetra Willd. ex Spreng. indigenous
 Trianthema triquetra Willd. ex Spreng. subsp. triquetra,  indigenous
 Trianthema triquetra Willd. ex Spreng. subsp. triquetra  var. triquetra,  indigenous

Tribulocarpus 
Genus Tribulocarpus:
 Tribulocarpus dimorphanthus (Pax) S.Moore, indigenous

Trichocyclus 
Genus Trichocyclus:
 Trichocyclus marlothii (Pax) N.E.Br. accepted as Mesembryanthemum marlothii Pax, indigenous
 Trichocyclus pubescens N.E.Br. ex C.A.Maass, accepted as Mesembryanthemum tomentosum Klak, indigenous
 Trichocyclus schenckii (Schinz) Dinter & Schwantes ex Range, accepted as Mesembryanthemum schenkii Schinz, indigenous

Trichodiadema 
Genus Trichodiadema:
 Trichodiadema attonsum (L.Bolus) Schwantes, endemic
 Trichodiadema aureum L.Bolus, endemic
 Trichodiadema barbatum (L.) Schwantes, endemic
 Trichodiadema bulbosum (Haw.) Schwantes, accepted as Trichodiadema intonsum (Haw.) Schwantes, present
 Trichodiadema burgeri L.Bolus, endemic
 Trichodiadema calvatum L.Bolus, endemic
 Trichodiadema concinnum L.Bolus, accepted as Trichodiadema intonsum (Haw.) Schwantes, present
 Trichodiadema decorum (N.E.Br.) Stearn ex H.Jacobsen, endemic
 Trichodiadema densum (Haw.) Schwantes, endemic
 Trichodiadema emarginatum L.Bolus, endemic
 Trichodiadema fergusoniae L.Bolus, endemic
 Trichodiadema fourcadei L.Bolus, endemic
 Trichodiadema gracile L.Bolus, endemic
 Trichodiadema gracile L.Bolus var. piliferum  L.Bolus, accepted as Trichodiadema gracile L.Bolus, present
 Trichodiadema gracile L.Bolus var. setiferum  L.Bolus, accepted as Trichodiadema gracile L.Bolus, present
 Trichodiadema hallii L.Bolus, endemic
 Trichodiadema hirsutum (Haw.) Stearn, endemic
 Trichodiadema imitans L.Bolus, endemic
 Trichodiadema intonsum (Haw.) Schwantes, endemic
 Trichodiadema introrsum (Haw. ex Hook.f.) Niesler, endemic
 Trichodiadema littlewoodii L.Bolus, indigenous
 Trichodiadema littlewoodii L.Bolus forma alba L.Bolus, accepted as Trichodiadema littlewoodii L.Bolus
 Trichodiadema marlothii L.Bolus, endemic
 Trichodiadema mirabile (N.E.Br.) Schwantes, endemic
 Trichodiadema mirabile (N.E.Br.) Schwantes var. leptum  L.Bolus, accepted as Trichodiadema mirabile (N.E.Br.) Schwantes, present
 Trichodiadema obliquum L.Bolus, endemic
 Trichodiadema occidentale L.Bolus, endemic
 Trichodiadema olivaceum L.Bolus, endemic
 Trichodiadema orientale L.Bolus, endemic
 Trichodiadema peersii L.Bolus, endemic
 Trichodiadema pomeridianum L.Bolus, indigenous
 Trichodiadema pygmaeum L.Bolus, endemic
 Trichodiadema rogersiae L.Bolus, endemic
 Trichodiadema rupicola L.Bolus, endemic
 Trichodiadema ryderae L.Bolus, endemic
 Trichodiadema schimperi (Engl.) Herre, accepted as Delosperma schimperi (Engl.) H.E.K.Hartmann & Niesler
 Trichodiadema setuliferum (N.E.Br.) Schwantes, endemic
 Trichodiadema setuliferum (N.E.Br.) Schwantes var. niveum  L.Bolus, accepted as Trichodiadema setuliferum (N.E.Br.) Schwantes, present
 Trichodiadema stayneri L.Bolus, endemic
 Trichodiadema stellatum (Mill.) Schwantes, accepted as Trichodiadema barbatum (L.) Schwantes, present
 Trichodiadema stelligerum (Haw.) Schwantes, accepted as Trichodiadema barbatum (L.) Schwantes, present
 Trichodiadema strumosum (Haw.) L.Bolus, endemic

Vanheerdea 
Genus Vanheerdea:
 Vanheerdea angusta (L.Bolus) L.Bolus, accepted as Vanheerdea roodiae (N.E.Br.) L.Bolus ex H.E.K.Hartmann, present
 Vanheerdea divergens (L.Bolus) L.Bolus, accepted as Vanheerdea roodiae (N.E.Br.) L.Bolus ex H.E.K.Hartmann, present
 Vanheerdea primosii (L.Bolus) L.Bolus ex H.E.K.Hartmann, endemic
 Vanheerdea roodiae (N.E.Br.) L.Bolus ex H.E.K.Hartmann, endemic

Vanzijlia 
Genus Vanzijlia:
 Vanzijlia annulata (A.Berger) L.Bolus, endemic

Vlokia 
Genus Vlokia:
 Vlokia ater S.A.Hammer, endemic
 Vlokia montana Klak, endemic

Volkeranthus 
Genus Volkeranthus:
 Volkeranthus aitonis (Jacq.) Gerbaulet, accepted as Mesembryanthemum aitonis Jacq. indigenous
 Volkeranthus longistylus (DC.) Gerbaulet, accepted as Mesembryanthemum longistylum DC. indigenous

Wooleya 
Genus Wooleya:
 Wooleya farinosa (L.Bolus) L.Bolus, endemic

Zaleya 
Genus Zaleya:
 Zaleya pentandra (L.) C.Jeffrey, indigenous

Zeuktophyllum 
Genus Zeuktophyllum:
 Zeuktophyllum calycinum (L.Bolus) H.E.K.Hartmann, endemic
 Zeuktophyllum suppositum (L.Bolus) N.E.Br. endemic

References

South African plant biodiversity lists
Aizoaceae